= Berwick =

Berwick may refer to:

== Places ==
=== Antarctica ===
- Berwick Glacier

=== Australia ===
- Berwick, Victoria
- City of Berwick, Victoria (defunct)

=== Canada ===
- Berwick, New Brunswick
- Berwick, Nova Scotia
- Berwick, Ontario

=== New Zealand ===
- Berwick, New Zealand

=== United Kingdom ===
==== England ====
- Berwick-upon-Tweed, Northumberland
  - Berwick-upon-Tweed railway station
- Berwick, East Sussex
  - Berwick railway station (East Sussex)
- Berwick, Gloucestershire
- Berwick Street Market, London
- Berwick Tunnel, Shropshire
- Berwick St John, Wiltshire

==== Scotland ====
- North Berwick, East Lothian
  - North Berwick Law, a hill situated to the south of the town
- County of Berwick, a historic county in south-east Scotland
- Berwick (Parliament of Scotland constituency)

=== United States ===
- Berwick, Illinois
- Berwick Township, Warren County, Illinois
- Berwick, Iowa
- Berwick, Kansas
- Berwick, Louisiana
- Berwick Bay, Louisiana
- Berwick, Maine
  - Berwick (CDP), Maine, a census-designated place within the town
- Berwick, Missouri
- Berwick Township, Newton County, Missouri
- Berwick, Ohio
- Berwick Hotel, Cambridge, Ohio
- Berwick (Columbus, Ohio)
- Berwick, North Dakota
- Berwick, Pennsylvania
- Berwick Area School District, Pennsylvania
- Berwick Township, Pennsylvania

== People ==
- Berwick (surname)
- Berwick (cricketer), English cricketer

== Facilities, structures ==
- Berwick Academy (disambiguation)
- Berwick Castle, in Berwick-upon-Tweed
- Berwick High School (disambiguation)
- Berwick power station (disambiguation), several station
- Berwick railway station (disambiguation), several stations
- Berwick College, a secondary college in Berwick, Victoria, Australia
- Berwick station (disambiguation)

== Groups, organizations, companies ==
- Berwick RFC, a rugby union team in Berwick-upon-Tweed
- Berwick Rangers F.C., a football team in Berwick-upon-Tweed

== Other uses ==
- Theta Nedra Berwick, a fictional character and protagonist of the Marvel Comics series Predator by Ed Brission
- Berwick (automobile), an electric car produced in 1904
- Berwick cockle, a confection from Berwick upon Tweed
- Berwick Prize, in mathematics, named for William Edward Hodgson Berwick
- HMS Berwick, several Royal Navy ships
- Treaty of Berwick (disambiguation), several treaties
