= Green Man (disambiguation) =

The Green Man is an architectural image of a foliate head.

Green Man or greenman may also refer to:

== Arts and entertainment ==
=== Characters ===
- Green Man (character), a DC Comics superhero
- Greenman, a giant fighting robot and the central character of Ike! Greenman, a tokusatsu television series
- Green Man, a persona assumed by Charlie Kelly in the sitcom It's Always Sunny In Philadelphia.
- Someshta, the Green Man, a character in Robert Jordan's The Wheel of Time fantasy series

=== Films, television, and stage ===
- The Green Man (film), a 1956 film starring Alastair Sim as a jovial freelance assassin
- The Green Man (TV serial), a 1990 BBC adaptation of the Kingsley Amis novel
- The Green Man, play by Doug Lucie
- "The Green Man", an episode of Midsomer Murders
- "The Green Man", an episode of Worzel Gummidge (2019 TV series)

=== Music ===
- Green Man (album), a 1996 album from British singer Mark Owen
- The Green Man (album), a 2000 album from British recording artist Roy Harper
- Green Man Festival, a major folk music festival held in the United Kingdom
- "Green Man", a song on the album October Rust by the band Type O Negative
- "Greenman", a song on the album Apple Venus Volume 1 by the new wave band XTC
- "Green Man", a song by the band Shut Up and Dance

=== Publications ===
- The Green Man, a 1966 novel by Henry Treece adapted from the tale of Amleth
- The Green Man (Amis novel), a 1969 ghost-story novel by British author Kingsley Amis
- The Green Man, a 1946 Harold Sherman novel
- The Green Man: Tales from the Mythic Forest, a 2002 anthology of short stories
- The Green Man Press, comic-book illustrator Charles Vess' publishing company

== People ==
- Greenman (surname)
- Albert DeSalvo, a 1960s serial rapist/killer – was arrested for the "Green Man" attacks, and then confessed to being the Boston Strangler
- Raymond Robinson (Green Man), a figure of Pennsylvania urban legend
- Little green men (Russo-Ukrainian War), troops without insignia who participated in the Russian annexation of Crimea

== Public houses in the UK ==
- Green Man, Ashbourne
- Green Man, Blackheath
- The Green Man, Hatfield
- Green Man, Leytonstone
- The Green Man, Potters Bar
- Green Man, Putney
- Green Man, Soho
- Green Man, Trumpington
- Green Man, Whetstone
- Greene Man, formerly the Green Man, in Marylebone
- The Green Man and Still
- The Green Man at Inglewhite

== Other uses ==
- Green Man (PGI), a figure associated with the Pyrotechnics Guild International, whose members may refer to each other as "green men"
- Green Man Brewery, a New Zealand brewery
- Al-Khidr, the Green Man, a Qur'anic figure prominent for his initiation of Moses
- Green man (symbol), an illuminated figure on traffic lights that indicates to pedestrians that they may cross the road
- Green Man (folklore), a term with a variety of connotations in folklore

== See also ==
- Green Knight, a figure in Arthurian legend
- Little Green Men (disambiguation), the stereotypical portrayal of extraterrestrials as small humanoid creatures with green skin
- The Green Men, supporters of the Vancouver Canucks
