= Xiaolüren =

Animated pedestrian crossing lights

A Striding Xiaolüren

Xiaolüren (Hsiao-lu-jen; Chinese: 小綠人; pinyin: Xiǎolǜrén; Wade–Giles: Hsiao^{3}-lü^{4}-jen^{2}; Little Green Man; officially Chinese: 行人倒數計時顯示, "Pedestrian Countdown Display") can refer to any pedestrian traffic lights, but most often the animated traffic light system originally from Taiwan. It was first implemented in Taipei City between Songshou Road and Songzhi Road, in 1999, and came into widespread use around the country and almost replaced incandescent, static and non-animated pedestrian traffic lights within a few years.

Green Man, Seville

The light displays an image of a green, blue, or white person, with or without a hat, animated in usually seven frames at varying speed to suggest relative urgency.

On 18 March 2016 Google celebrated Xiaolüren's 17th birthday with a Google Doodle.

A similar figure as a crossing signal first appeared in East Berlin in 1961 and gained the local nickname Ampelmännchen, but was static rather than animated.

== History ==
Ampelmännchen, a person-shaped symbol on traffic signals for pedestrians, was created in 1961 by traffic psychologist Karl Peglau (1927–2009) as part of a proposal for a new traffic lights layout in East Berlin, Germany. The sign is generally for pedestrian road-crossings. The frontal-facing red person denotes "stop", while the animated side-facing green person in the striding motion denotes "go ahead". Until 1998, however, the green person was static rather than animated in other cities of the world, including Berlin.

In 1998, following the lead of cities such as those in Spain, the Taipei City Government intended on adding a count-down timer to all static pedestrian traffic signals. Together, the Department of Transportation (Chinese: 臺北市政府交通局), the Chinese Signal Company (Chinese: 中華號誌協會), other participating companies created the “dynamic crossroad signal for pedestrians”. By the end of that year, the Taipei City Government had started testing and installing these new animated Xiaolüren.

This specially-designed sign follows the Traffic Signs, Marking and Lights Installation Regulation issued by the Taiwan Ministry of Transportation and Communications. Its main function is to improve perceptibility of traffic signals for pedestrians. Other than retaining the general concept of “go at green, stop at red”, features of a count-down timer and the walking animation of Xiaolüren are added.

=== Testing and launch ===
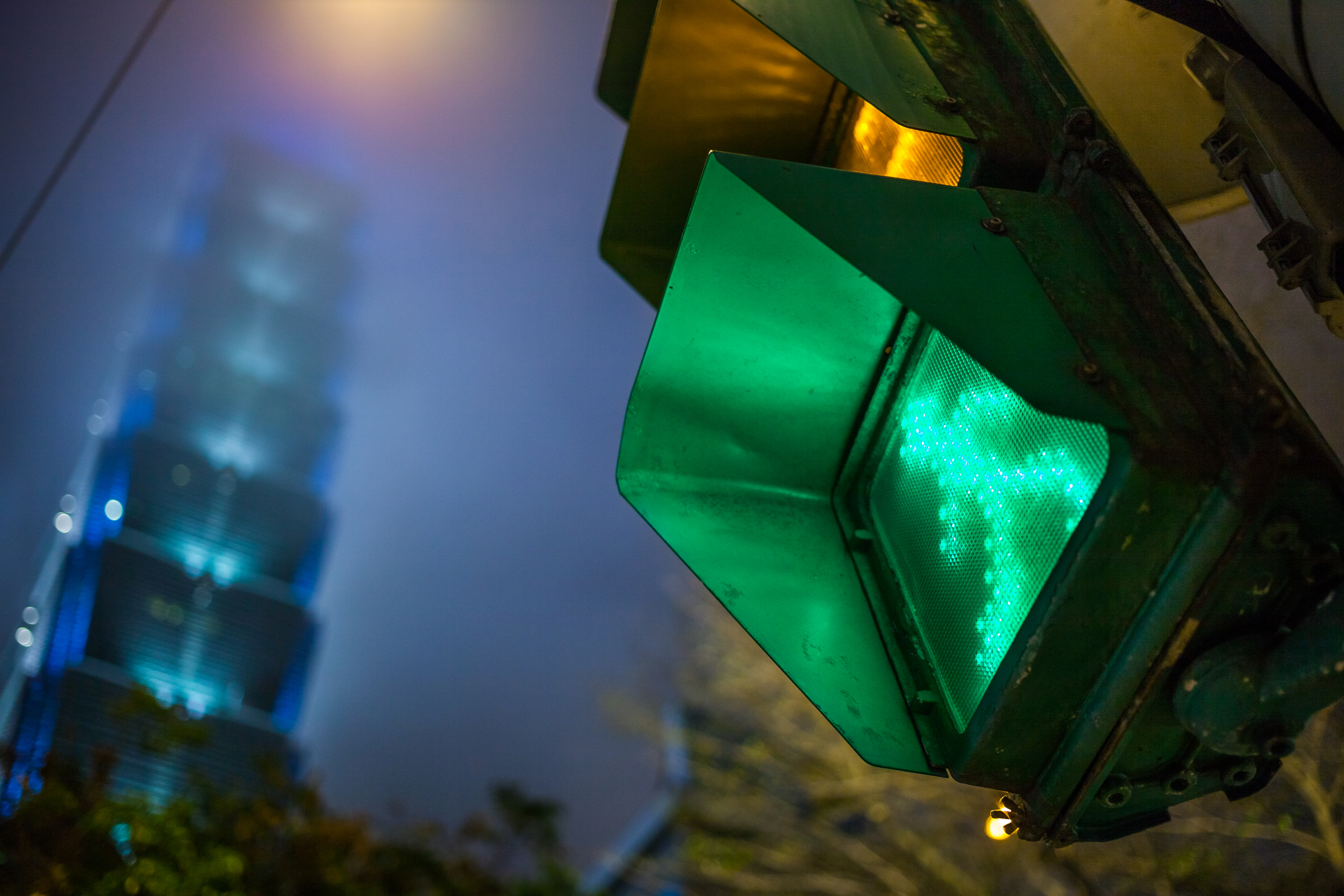
The very first in-service Xiaolüren, located at the intersection of Songzhi and Songshou roads near Taipei 101, which is displayed on the left side of the photo

From the end of 1998 to March 1999, Taipei City Hall set three experimental count-down pedestrian signals at Sun Yat-sen Memorial Hall (Guangfu S. Rd.), Daan Forest Park (Xinsheng South Rd.) and VIESHOW Cinemas (Songzhi Rd.). All were made with similar concepts but different designs. The three count-down pedestrian signals were sponsored by non-governmental organizations in Taiwan.

At start of 1999, Xiaolüren device at the intersection of Songzhi Rd. and Songshou Rd. was adopted by Taipei City Hall after the run-off. On 18 March 1999, Taipei City Hall not only officially started using Xiaolüren at the intersection, but also decided to use this signal as the model of all the pedestrian signals in Taipei and started replacing previous signals.

By the end of 2003, there were already 1,139 intersections among all the 1,364 with three-colored traffic lights at which there were retrofitted Xiaolürens in Taipei, and over 1,300 in year 2007. The Xiaolüren signal has been included in the Traffic Signs, Marking and Lights Installation Rules amended by the Ministry of Transportation and Communications, Republic of China.

According to Taipei City Traffic Engineering Office's statistics, there were 11,848 original light bulb pedestrian signals; all were re-equipped with LED light signals until the end of 2010. The re-equipped ones and the newly built ones add up to 16,832 LED count-down pedestrian signals in Taipei City.

In 2017, Pingtung county police bureau announced that they will introduce an additional female figure to pedestrian traffic lights, reported the Taiwan News website. The couple is seen walking across the street hand in hand when the light is green, and when it turns red, the man will kneel down to propose to his girlfriend with a love heart appearing between them. After four months of depicting a couple, the pedestrian crossing lights featuring a little green man with his girlfriend in Taiwan's southern city of Pingtung, have been upgraded to the follow-up version depicting them becoming parents. The girlfriend is pregnant on the red light and the couple welcoming their first child on the green light.

== Design guidelines ==
The animated pedestrian signs test-driven by the Taipei City Government were built along these guidelines:

- Walking animation: The blue/green walking signal is usually constructed by seven differently shaped and positioned icons, and the walking or running movements are a result of persistence of vision. The Little Green Man moves in two or three different velocities: slow, fast, and occasionally, extremely fast. When the sign turns green, the little green man would first move slowly. After a certain duration of time (usually 14 seconds left on the countdown display, depending on width of pedestrian crossing), the animation would occasionally start moving at a faster speed or just simply flicker. When there is only ten seconds left to cross the street, the animation would occasionally move at its fastest speed and/or flicker. In March 2026, the Ministry of Transportation announced that the running animations will be removed to prevent encouraging pedestrians from rushing across the intersection at the end of the pedestrian phase, rather than waiting for the next phase.
- Countdown display: When the sign turns blue/green, the other window shows the amount of time left before the sign turns red again. It is usually allotted a specific two-digit seconds to countdown to zero. Because there are only two digits on the display, if the allotted duration of time exceeds 99 seconds, the display would only start counting down when there are 99 seconds left until the sign turns red. In addition, on one version of xiaolüren traffic lights, the “6” and “9” figures on the display are designed differently from conventional digital numbers used in most versions. The top bar of “6” and the bottom bar of “9” are eliminated, however once the lights start getting old and breaking apart, the bottom and top lines become visible, to prevent the numbers in the lights becoming completely unreadable. The numbers are yellow, white, blue, or green when counting down the blue/green lights, and red or yellow when otherwise.
- Red standing figure/hand: When the system sends out a “stop walking” signal to the device, the countdown display originally on the top window becomes replaced by a red standing figure or hand. The bottom window, previously showing the walking animation, sometimes becomes a countdown display in red, although there are many versions of xiaolüren pedestrian lights where countdowns are absent and not build in to red lights, red light timers also break more easily than green light timers, as the devices are possibly programmed to believe that green/blue light timers are more important than red light timers. Occasionally, the red light starts out flickering, often with a countdown display, telling pedestrians to go faster, then stops, telling pedestrians to completely stop.

== Prevalence ==
This design of traffic signal has been in use since 2000, used in 1000+ intersections in Taipei City, New Taipei City, Taoyuan, Hsinchu, Taichung, Tainan and Kaohsiung, along with several places globally. With its commonality in some places in Japan, the little green man may be seen as a form of folk culture.

Traffic lights are also equipped with countdown timers. There were originally red-light and green-light timers, but the latter was taken down due to accidents induced by encouraging drivers to speed up as the green-light timers ended. Red-light timers are intended to inform drivers of the time remaining for waiting but also make the drivers focus on their signal instead of the green light in the other direction. This reduces clashes between cars that start too early and cars that run a yellow light.

== Controversy ==
Ming Shiun Chang, the chief manager of Eucertec, protested through a councilman, claiming that he was the inventor of the little green man. Since the Ministry of Transportation & Communication proclaimed that the device is an aggregative creation and thus should be public property, Chang has stated his will to resort to the law.

== See also ==
- Little Green Men (disambiguation)
- Ampelmännchen
- List of Taiwanese inventions and discoveries
