= Berwick railway station =

Berwick railway station may refer to:

- Berwick-upon-Tweed railway station, on the East Coast Main Line in Northumberland, England
- Berwick railway station (East Sussex), on the East Coastway Line in East Sussex, England
- Berwick railway station, Melbourne, on the Pakenham line in Victoria, Australia

== See also ==
- North Berwick railway station, in East Lothian, Scotland, UK
- Berwick station (disambiguation)
- Berwick (disambiguation)
