= Berwick Street =

Street in Soho, London

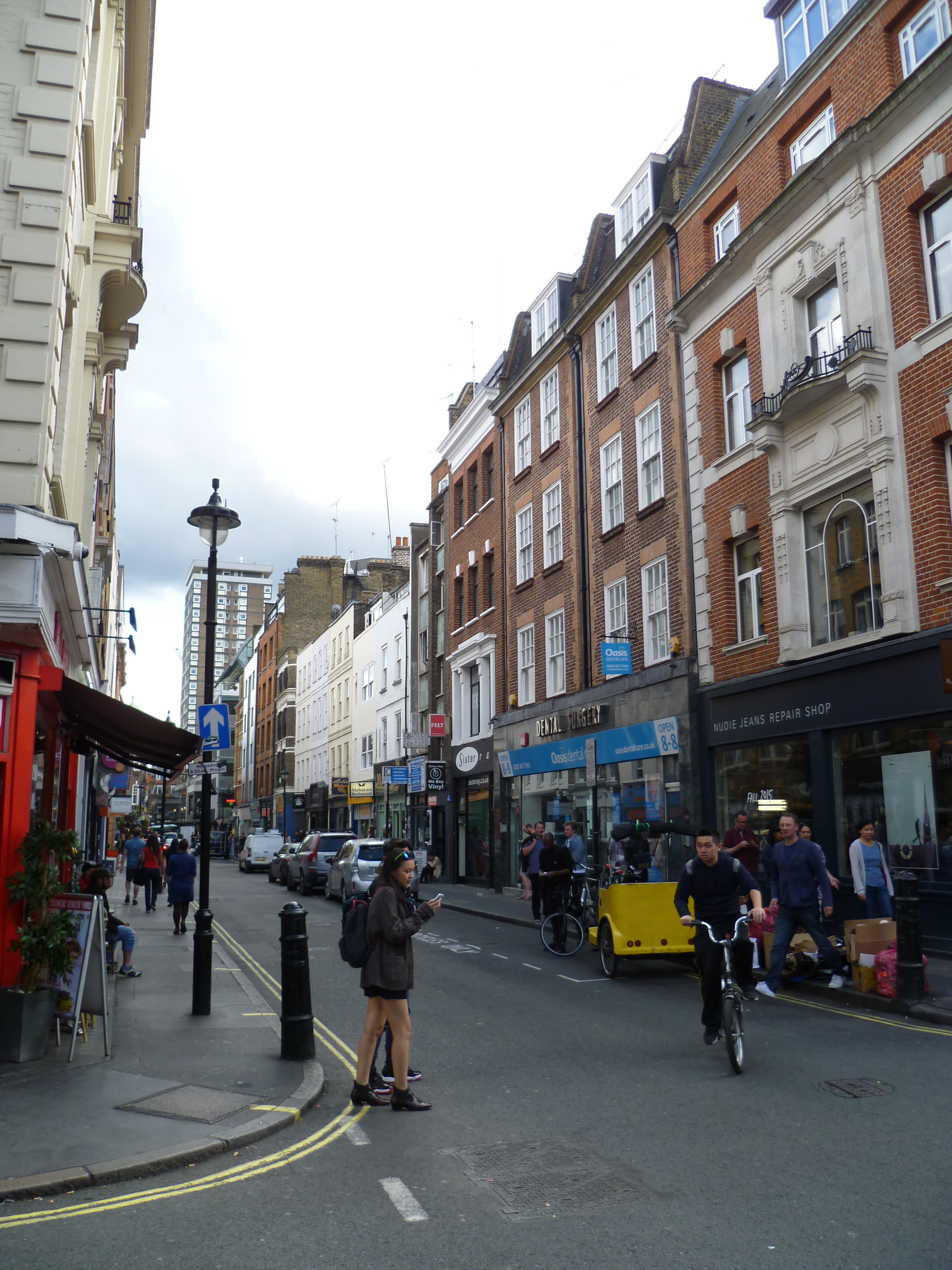
- Berwick Street, Soho

- Location within City of Westminster
- Owner: City of Westminster
- Maintained by: City of Westminster
- Length: 378 metres (1,240 ft)
- Location: Westminster, London W1 F
- Postal code: W1 F
- Coordinates: 51.51467°N 0.13582°W
- Berwick Street Market
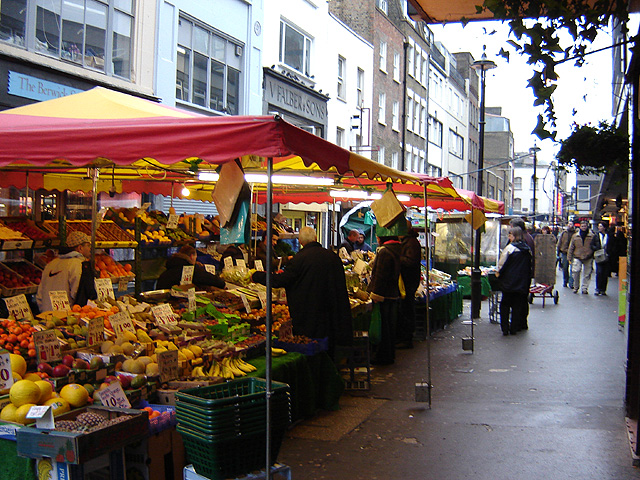
- Location: Berwick Street W1 F
- Opening date: c. 1843
- Management: City of Westminster
- Owner: City of Westminster
- Environment: Outdoor
- Goods sold: fruit and vegetables, flowers, coffee, dairy products, and street food
- Days normally open: Monday–Saturday
- Website: Westminster Council's markets webpage
- Interactive map of Berwick Street Market

Berwick Street is a street in the Soho district of the City of Westminster, running between Oxford Street to the north and Peter Street at the south. It was built towards the end of the 17th century; several early 18th-century buildings have survived. The street is the site of a 183–184 year old street market.

== History ==
Berwick Street was built between 1687 and 1703, and is believed to be named after James FitzJames, 1st Duke of Berwick. Several buildings constructed in the 1730s are still standing, such as the Green Man public house at No. 57, which was built in 1738.

A non-conforming church in Berwick Street was opened in 1689. A new church designed by Edward Blore and dedicated to St Luke, was consecrated on 23 July 1839.

A major cholera outbreak was centred around Berwick Street in 1854.

Kemp House is at No. 90. It was constructed between 1959-61 by L. C. Hollbrook.

== Market ==
Whilst some secondary sources claim that the market was established in the 18th century, the market is not listed in London Labour and the London Poor by Henry Mayhew's. In 1893 the London County Council's survey of London markets, records that the market began in c. 1843. The report states that many of the traders had relocated from Seven Dials following the construction of Shaftesbury Avenue. It lists 32 stalls on a Saturday with 20 being present on weekdays. Ten of the traders are listed as grocers or fruiters.

There is a small outdoor general retail market on Berwick Street, selling fruit and vegetables, hot food, fish, clothing, accessories, household goods, luggage, jewelry and general goods. It is open Monday to Saturday from 8 am until 6 pm.

== Cultural references ==
The cover photograph of Oasis' second album (What's the Story) Morning Glory? was taken at Berwick Street.
