= Berwick, East Sussex =

Village and parish in East Sussex, England

Coordinates: 50.83°N 0.15°E

Berwick
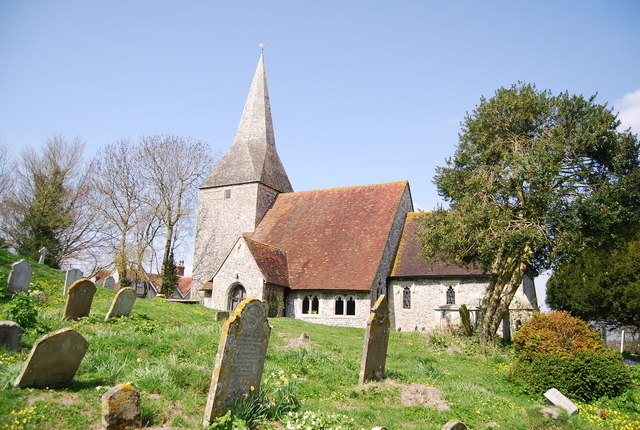
- St Michael & All Angels' Church, Berwick

- Location within East Sussex
- Area: 5.0 km^{2} (1.9 sq mi)
- Population: 380 (Parish-2011)
  - Density: 149/sq mi (58/km^{2})
- OS grid reference: TQ518051
  - London: 48 miles (77 km) NNW
- District: Wealden
- Shire county: East Sussex
- Region: South East
- Country: England
- Sovereign state: United Kingdom
- Post town: POLEGATE
- Postcode district: BN26
- Dialling code: 01323
- Police: Sussex
- Fire: East Sussex
- Ambulance: South East Coast
- UK Parliament: Lewes

Berwick (pronounced /ˈbɜːrwɪk/ BUR-wik or, more recently, /ˈbɛrɪk/ BERR-ik) is a village and civil parish in the Wealden district of East Sussex in England. The village lies immediately to the south of the A27 road between Lewes and Polegate, about three miles (4.8 km) west of the latter. The parish is located in the River Cuckmere floodplain, north of the South Downs.

The place-name 'Berwick' is here first attested in the Domesday Book of 1086, where it appears as Berewice. The name means 'corn farm'.

There are two public houses in the parish: the Berwick Inn near the railway station, and The Cricketers, in the village itself. The village also has an example of a "K6" red telephone box.

== Berwick Church ==
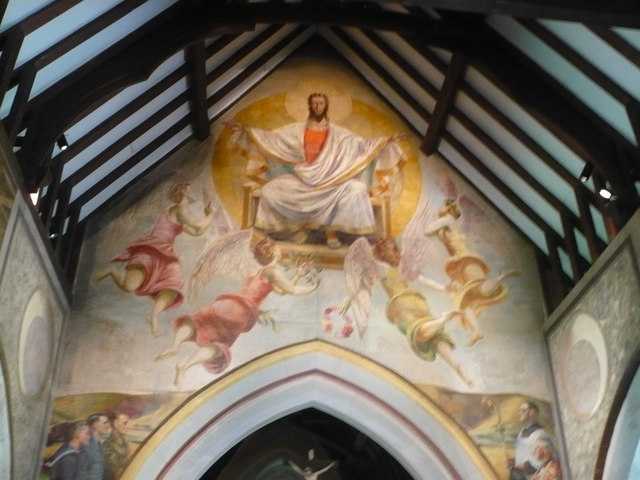
The chancel arch, St Michael and All Angels, Berwick

Part of the United Benefice of Arlington, Berwick, Selmeston-with-Alciston and Wilmington, the church dedicated to St Michael and All Angels, is a Grade I listed building. Built on what may be a pre-Christian sacred site, the church dates back at least to the 12th century, although the Saxon frontage appears to be earlier. Additions were made in the 14th century, and a tower built in 1603, originally with a spire. The building suffered in the 18th century, losing its spire to lightning on 8 August 1773.

Several Victorian leaded windows were damaged by World War II bombs on 17 October 1944. They were replaced by clear glass, unusual in churches, for fear of further damage. However, some of the church's stained-glass windows survived.

The clear-glass windows help to illuminate the church's unique murals. Partly inspired by the pre-Reformation practice of decorating churches with murals, these were painted in 1941 by Duncan Grant, Vanessa Bell, and Quentin Bell, of the Bloomsbury Group. The murals depict local people, sometimes in period clothes, but set in biblical scenes.

== Berwick Station ==
Berwick Station is a small settlement that has grown up around Berwick railway station. Located about two miles (3.2 km) north of the main village of Berwick, Berwick Station includes a garage and a pub called the Berwick Inn (previously The Fullers' Arms). The Vanguard Way, which links Croydon and Newhaven, runs through the village.

Berwick railway station lies on the East Coastway Line between Glynde and Polegate railway stations.

== Berwick industry ==
The Ludlay Brick and Tile Company comprised a clay pit and a brick-works. The works were established by 1880 and were close to Berwick Church. The two were linked by a 2' gauge tramway. Until about 1950 bricks were only made during the summer because it was not possible to dry them in winter. Some work was done during winter, digging clay and piling it up to 'weather'. The works closed in 1965, remaining derelict for 54 years and a dense forest grew around it, until Firle Estate blocked off the path through the derelict building and cut down all the trees.

== Long-distance walks and countryside ==
The Vanguard Way, a long-distance walk, goes through the village, and the South Downs Way passes along the Downs just above it. Walkers often stop and travel down into the village. A common walk in this area is to start at the village car park, walk down the road known as The Village, past Church Farm and the tyre heap, and on to the dilapidated New Barn, just a few years ago an important store for hay from the surrounding fields, but now falling apart. This building is made of attractive red-rusting iron and next to it is an old stone farmhouse - currently unused and overgrown with plants, but in good condition, it is home to wood warblers in the summer and grey wagtails often feed by it. The hedgerows in this area are excellent for bird life and a lot of rabbits can be seen hopping around. Walks can continue from the New Barn up along a shaded avenue to a large hedgerow full of blackberries in autumn. From here there is a winding path up onto the Downs and this is where the walker meets the South Downs Way. One can then continue into Alfriston. The area at the end of this walk is home to red foxes.
