= Berwick, New Zealand =

Locality in Dunedin City, Otago Region, New Zealand

Coordinates: 45°57′S 170°06′E

Berwick is a small farming community on the banks of the Waipori River at the southwestern limit of Dunedin city, New Zealand, some 40 kilometres from the city centre. It lies close to the border with Clutha District. To the south of Berwick is the Berwick Forest, a large pine plantation.

Berwick is also the location of one of the Otago Youth Adventure Trust's campsites.

It is unclear which Berwick the community is named after, but the leading candidate is Berwick-upon-Tweed in Northumberland.
