= Berwick Forest, New Zealand =

New Zealand forest

Coordinates: 45.95°S 169.97°E

Berwick Forest is a large Pinus radiata (Pine) plantation at Berwick in New Zealand, around 40 km west of Dunedin. The forest lies close to the banks of the Waipori River immediately below and around the western end of Lake Mahinerangi, and consists of three blocks - the main block, Maungatua, and Waitahuna, with a total area of 13,141 hectares. The land is owned by Otago Land Company, a sub company of Boston-based investment company GMO LLC, the trees by Wenita Forest Products, which has shareholders Sinotrans (62%), the Chinese shipping company, and GMO.

The forest is popular with hunters from Otago, with both deer and wild pigs that have escaped from farms as common prey. The forest surrounds the Otago Youth Adventure Trust's Berwick Lodge.

The forest was subject to a large forest fire in the late 1990s that destroyed several square kilometres of trees, and caused NZ$12 million (US$7 million) worth of damage. The cause of the fire was thought to have been sunlight shining through discarded glass.
