= Berwick Academy =

Berwick Academy may refer to:

- Berwick Academy, Berwick-upon-Tweed, an upper school in Berwick-upon-Tweed, Northumberland, England
- Berwick Academy (Maine), a college preparatory school in South Berwick, Maine, United States

== See also ==
- Berwick (disambiguation)
- Berwick High School (disambiguation)
