= Berwick power station =

Berwick power station may refer to:

- Berwick-upon-Tweed Power Station, a demolished coal-fired power station in[North East England
- Susquehanna Steam Electric Station, a nuclear power station near Berwick, Pennsylvania
- Cockenzie Power Station, a coal-fired power station near North Berwick, Scotland

== See also ==
- Berwick (disambiguation)
- Berwick station (disambiguation)
