= Traffic psychology =

Discipline of psychology

Traffic psychology is a discipline of psychology that studies the relationship between psychological processes and the behavior of road users. In general, traffic psychology aims to apply theoretical aspects of psychology in order to improve traffic mobility by helping to develop and apply crash countermeasures, as well as by guiding desired behaviors through education and the motivation of road users.

Behavior is frequently studied in conjunction with crash research in order to assess causes and differences in crash involvement. Traffic psychologists distinguish three motivations of driver behavior: reasoned or planned behavior, impulsive or emotional behavior, and habitual behavior. Additionally, social and cognitive applications of psychology are used, such as enforcement, road safety education campaigns, and also therapeutic and rehabilitation programs.

Broad theories of cognition, sensory-motor and neurological aspects psychology are also applied to the field of traffic psychology. Studies of factors such as attention, memory, spatial cognition, inexperience, stress, inebriation, distracting/ambiguous stimuli, fatigue, and secondary tasks such as phone conversations are used to understand and investigate the experience and actions of road users.

== Definition(s) ==
Traffic psychology focuses on the cognitive, non cognitive, and sensory-motor aspects of individuals within the driving and traffic environment. By examining the emotions that influence cognitive processes, traffic psychology helps us understand the resulting actions and offers strategies to modify behavior.

As a tool, traffic psychology employs subjective analysis to improve overall quality of life by observing, identifying, and modifying behavior. Its primary objective is to understand, predict, and implement measures to change road use behavior, ultimately aiming to reduce the negative impacts of traffic participation.

== Behavior research ==
Behavior research in traffic psychology often deals with subjects like motivation, personality and gender differences, habits, overconfidence, age and skill differences, attention, and violation of traffic rules.

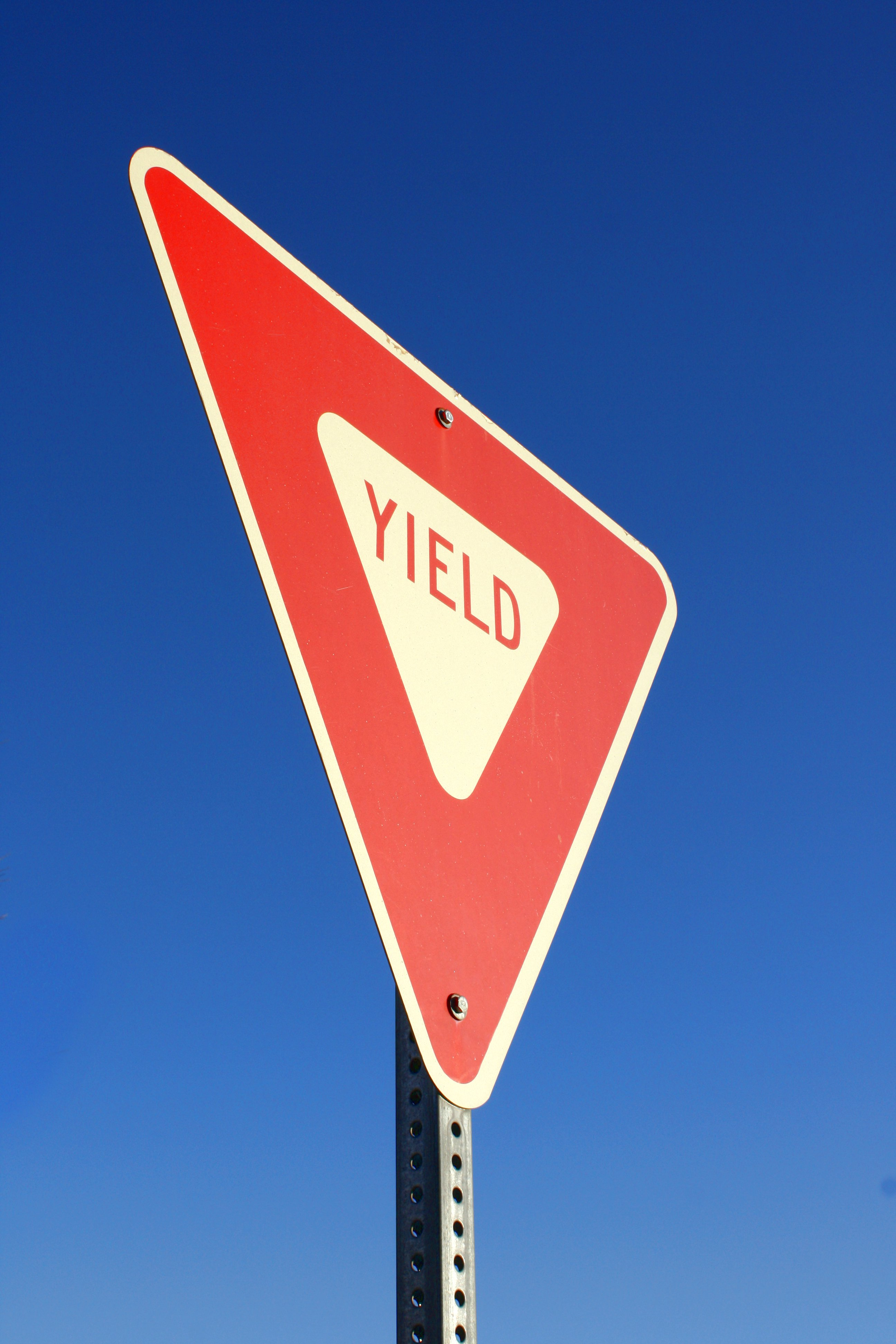
Yield sign

A classification of behavioral factors into those that reduce driving capability and those that promote risky behavior with further division into those with short- and long-term impact helps the conceptualization of the problems and may contribute to the prioritization of behavior modification.

Traffic and transport sciences concern themselves with the study, comprehension, explanation and prediction of everything related to the mobility of people and products. It incorporates several aspects of the transportation systems along with multiple techniques. This process attempts to develop valid and reliable methods to better understand and predict the effects of human variability with its environmental interactions on safety.

The transportation system consists of road, rail, sea and air infrastructures. It includes the possibilities and limitations of its economics, laws and regulations, which sets barriers to the capabilities of an individual and mass motorist. For instance, speed can be influenced by method of travel (vehicle, airplane, train or ship), by financial capabilities for the type of vehicle (jet versus commercial, speed boat against sail boat and sedan compared to a luxury sports car), or by regulations such as speed limits in rural areas versus city driving.

The traffic environment takes into account location, time constraints, population and dangers that are exposed to motorists. These environmental factors pose danger and risk to motorists that may be fatal. Driving in wet, narrow, and dark conditions exposes drivers to far greater risk than driving on a sunny day on an open road. This is just one type of road factor for crashes that Sullman goes on to explain in further detail:

…crashes include lack of visibility or obstructions, unclean road or loose material, poor road conditions or road markings, and the horizontal curvature of the road. Environmental influences such as cold or hot weather, noise and vibration are all more likely to impact on stress and fatigue states

Variability of the driver's age, personality, temperament, stress and expertise affect speed, control and decisions. Drivers generally use some degree of risk compensation to assess driving decisions and it is skewed by varying levels of intoxication. Alcohol and drug usage, alertness and fatigue, distraction and focus are a few of the main factors attributed to driver error and crashes.

== Crash research ==
In addition to behavior research, crash research is also a component in traffic psychology, looking at driving methodology, individual differences, characteristics of personality, temporary impairments, and relevant capabilities, the driver as an information processor (includes perception and reaction times), human factors on highway crashes, and the pedestrian (identifying vulnerability, causes and prevention of crashes).

=== Human factors ===
Examination of the operator plays a large role in transportation psychology. While many external factors influence traffic safety, internal factors are also significant. Some factors include:

- Decision-making
- Demographics
- Distraction
- Detection Thresholds
- Drugs and alcohol
- Driving training and experience
- Familiarity with vehicle and environment
- Fatigue
- Individual differences in driving
- Inattention
- Perception-reaction time
- Response to the unexpected
- Risky behaviors
- Stress and panic
- Task capability

== Psychological research ==
=== Neuropsychology ===
Linking brain regions, networks, and circuits with behaviors involved in operating a vehicle is one of the more salient topics of research within traffic psychology. Seven separate brain networks have been identified in driving simulations as being of importance to the neurophysiological processes involved in driving. The networks each have a unique function as outlined by Porter: The parietoccipital sulcus is involved in visual monitoring, motor cortex and cerebellar areas—for gross motor control and motor planning; orbitofrontal and cingulate — for error monitoring and inhibition, including motivation, risk assessment, and internal space; and medial frontal, parietal, and posterior cingulate for vigilance, including spatial attention, visual stream, monitoring, and external space. By linking neuropsychological processes and driving, the ability to understand errors, development, and safety is enhanced. The involvement of motor and cerebellar networks in driving was confirmed by Calhoun, Pekar, and Pearlson (2004). Research in alcohol dosage and its related effect on neuropsychological processes found that greater quantities of alcohol created a larger likelihood to engage in high speed driving and an increase in the number of times the speed limit was exceeded.

== Psychological assessment, counseling, and rehabilitation ==
Rehabilitation counseling is a process because of the many steps involved for an individual to become self-reliant. A driver rehabilitation specialist (DRS) is one who “plans, develops, coordinates and implements driving service for individuals with disabilities” DSR's may come from backgrounds such as physical therapy, psychology, and driver education.

Evaluating a driver requires many aspects. A clinical assessment includes a review of the medical history, driving history, and driving needs. Visual and perceptual assessment along range of motion, motor strength, coordination, sensation, reaction time and cognitive assessment is a crucial aspect and the focus of the medical history evaluation.

“An initial driver evaluation can last one to four hours, depending on the client’s presenting disabilities and driving needs. Following the clinical assessment, clients undergo an on-road assessment if they meet the minimum state standards for health and vision, and the client holds a valid driver’s license or permit. The on-road assessment is performed in a driver rehabilitation vehicle equipped with dual brakes, rear-view mirror and eye-check mirror for the DRS, and any necessary adaptive equipment”

The goal in the rehabilitation process is to have the individual realize their condition and attempt to reinstate them into a driving environment in which they will pose no threat to others.

== Approach ==
Transportation psychology has emerged rapidly since the 1980s and, from its inception, has followed an interdisciplinary approach and has shared common topics with other fields, in particular medicine (e.g. driving aptitude), engineering (e.g. ergonomics and human factors), and economics (e.g. travel demand management). Mobility, including its positive and negative repercussions, originates in people's decisions and behavior – and these could be influenced. The main causes of traffic crashes are errors due to maladaptive behavior in interaction with roadways or other vehicles.

== See also ==
- Cognitive ergonomics
- Engineering psychology
- Human factors
- Mental chronometry
- Road rage
- Karl Peglau
- Media related to Traffic psychology at Wikimedia Commons
- Roundabout
