= Little Green Men (disambiguation) =

Little green men refers to the stereotypical portrayal of extraterrestrials as small humanoid-like creatures with green skin.

Little Green Men may also refer to:

- Little Green Men (novel), by comic novelist Christopher Buckley
- Little green men (Russo-Ukrainian War), unidentified members of the Russian armed forces who suddenly appeared out of nowhere in Crimea in 2014 as the vanguard of the Russian invasion
- "Little Green Men" (Star Trek: Deep Space Nine), a 1995 (fourth-season) episode of Star Trek: Deep Space Nine
- "Little Green Men" (The X-Files), second-season episode of The X-Files
- Little Green Men (Toy Story), alien race in Toy Story
- "Little Green Men", a track from Steve Vai's debut album Flex-Able
- Little Green Men Games, a Croatian video game developer
- "Little Green Man" (My Hero), a 2002 television episode
- The Little Green Man, a British animated cartoon series
- Army men, the small plastic green toy soldiers
- Elgyem, a Pokémon species based on little green men ("LGM") in its design, characteristics, and name
- Enanitos Verdes (Spanish for "Little Green Men"), Argentine rock band
- LGM-1, for "Little Green Men 1", nickname for the first radio pulsar discovered
- Xiaolüren (Chinese for "Little Green Men"), the animated traffic light system in Taiwan

== See also ==
- Green Man (disambiguation)
