= Berwick High School =

Berwick High School may refer to:

- Berwick High School (Louisiana), a public high school in Berwick, Louisiana, USA
- Berwick High School (Berwick, Maine), listed on the National Register of Historic Places in York County
- Berwick Area Senior High School, (also called Berwick High School), a public high school in Berwick, Pennsylvania, USA

== See also ==
- North Berwick High School, a public high school in North Berwick, East Lothian, Scotland, UK
- Noble High School (Maine) a public high school in North Berwick, Maine, USA
- Berwick Secondary College, a public high school in Victoria, Australia
- Berwick Academy (disambiguation)
- Berwick (disambiguation)
