= Berwick station =

Berwick station may refer to:

- Berwick railway station (disambiguation)
- Berwick power station (disambiguation)

== See also ==
- North Berwick Lifeboat Station, North Berwick, East Lothian, Scotland, UK
- Berwick (disambiguation)
