= Pyrotechnics Guild International =

Multi-national organization for fireworks enthusiasts

The Pyrotechnics Guild International or PGI is an independent worldwide nonprofit organization of amateur and professional fireworks enthusiasts founded in 1969. It's the largest pyrotechnics community in the world.

The Guild has a yearly convention. People from all over the world come to this event that lasts for about a week.

== Educational and scientific purposes ==
The PGI strives to promote the safe and responsible display and use of pyrotechnics and fireworks. Fireworks display operator training is offered, as well as classes on specific safety and legality issues.

The PGI encourages the display of public and private fireworks in conjunction with local and national holidays as well as patriotic and other events. Fireworks are a part of our heritage, and only through their responsible use will they continue to be available.

The PGI promotes the production and sale of high quality fireworks. Vendors who are found to be exceptional are invited to display fireworks during the PGI annual convention, as well as to advertise in the quarterly bulletins.

The PGI helps channel the creative energies of talented people into the design, production and display of high quality fireworks by example of the membership and through the sharing of knowledge. Many of these talented people would not know each other if they had not been united by the PGI. Information sharing occurs through the quarterly bulletins, during the week of the convention, and through an online mailing list.

== Major Activities ==
1. The PGI Annual Convention: a week-long event held in early August, in a variety of locations. The convention includes many hands-on activities, such as classes and seminars, and construction of the "Superstring". There are nightly fireworks displays, each one bigger than the last, as well as fireworks sales and competitions.

2. The PGI Bulletin: a quality periodical published five times per year, containing guild news, pyrotechnic articles, historical articles, and advertising.

3. The PGI Website: providing access and information both to members and the general public.

4. The PGI Display Operators' Certification Course: offering comprehensive classroom instruction, field demonstrations, and written testing for potential display operators.

== Friends of the PGI ==
The Fireworks Foundation, a non-profit group which works to ensure, in perpetuity, the existence of hobbyist fireworks and clubs.

The American Pyrotechnics Association, the premier trade association of the fireworks industry, founded in 1948.

Local or regional fireworks clubs which allow their members to safely and legally engage in fireworks related activities such as learning what is involved in designing and setting up a display, how various fireworks are made or simply enjoying the show.

== History ==
The Pyrotechnics Guild International was founded in 1969 by Max P. Vander Horck, then publisher of a monthly fireworks newsletter titled "American Pyrotechnist." Max envisioned the establishment of an organization for fireworks enthusiasts, whose goal was not only to educate themselves regarding pyrotechnics, but the media, politicians, and public as well.

In March 1969 he announced to his subscribers that membership was available in a newly founded organization called the Pyrotechnics Guild International, and the PGI was born. The membership expanded for a few years and in 1974 a formal charter and bylaws were drawn up, officers elected, and formal incorporation accomplished (in Illinois), and the PGI became the PGI, Inc.

Current membership stands at over 3,500. Members are from all walks of life, and range from people with just a passing interest all the way up to hard-core fireworks enthusiasts. Many regional clubs have sprung up over the last few years and have their own agenda of fireworks related activities.

== See also ==
- Green Man (PGI)
