= Green Man, Blackheath =

Demolished pub in Blackheath, London

Coordinates: 51.4725°N 0.0081°W

The Green Man
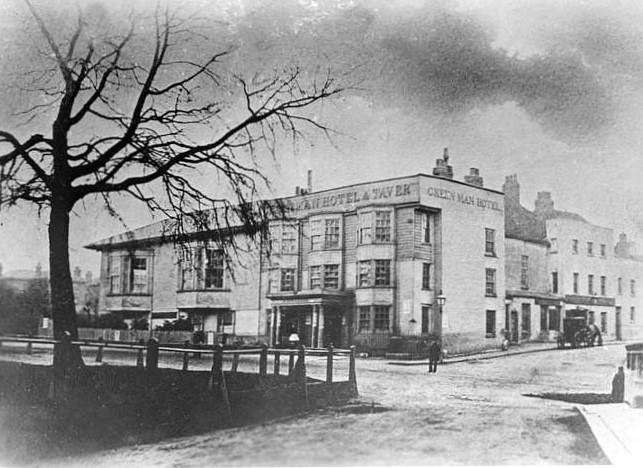
- The Green Man Hotel & Tavern, c. 1868, before it was replaced by a Victorian building.]
- Interactive map of the The Green Man area

General information
- Location: Blackheath Hill, Blackheath, London
- Years built: originally 1600s, rebuilt 1868
- Demolished: 1970

The Green Man was a public house on Blackheath Hill (now the A2), in Blackheath, London. It was an important stop for coach traffic owing to its position and was used as the headquarters of the Royal Blackheath Golf Club. It hosted "free-and-easy" music hall evenings in the 19th century and jazz and pop music in the 20th. It was a significant local landmark for over 300 years before its demolition in 1970.

== Origins ==
The pub had existed since at least 1629. It was reportedly named after Herne the Hunter who is believed to have had a group of worshippers in a cavern below the premises. It became an important stop for coach traffic owing to its position at the top of Blackheath Hill and on the edge of the heath. It was subsequently used as the headquarters of Royal Blackheath Golf Club.

== 19th century ==
The first recorded occasion of a toast to the "Immortal Memory" of Horatio Nelson was on Trafalgar Day (21 October), 1811 at the pub.

During the 19th century, the pub took customers from the Chocolate House on Shooters Hill Road which had been a prominent local establishment during the eighteenth century. The Chocolate House subsequently closed.

Madame Tussaud took her wax works show there on several occasions over three decades, the final one in late 1833 which was the last before finding a permanent home in London.

The Inn was also used as a postal collection point.

Between 1850 and 1902 it held "free-and-easy" music hall evenings.

In 1854, the bowling green to the rear of the pub was developed into properties, which now makes up part of Dartmouth Terrace. In 1868, the inn was demolished and rebuilt in a grand Victorian style. It housed a large function room that was used as a meeting place for various groups.

== 20th century ==
During the early 1960s, the pub hosted the Jazzhouse Club, a popular jazz music venue run by Colin Richardson, who later managed the New Jazz Orchestra and Colosseum. Guests included Graham Bond, Tubby Hayes, Ronnie Scott, Manfred Mann, Ian Carr and Jon Hiseman. Paul Simon played an early solo concert at the club as a last-minute replacement for Judy Collins. A sixteen-year-old David Bowie (then billed as David Jones) was the saxophonist with the Konrads, his first professional band, which was booked to play at the pub in 1963. Lead singer Roger Ferris cut himself on broken glass in the changing room and had to be hospitalised, so Bowie took over as lead singer for this and subsequent gigs.

In 1970, the pub was demolished and replaced by Allison Close, a block of flats.

== See also ==
- Green Man
