= Green Man, Trumpington =

Pub in Cambridge, England

Coordinates: 52°10′36″N 0°06′47″E

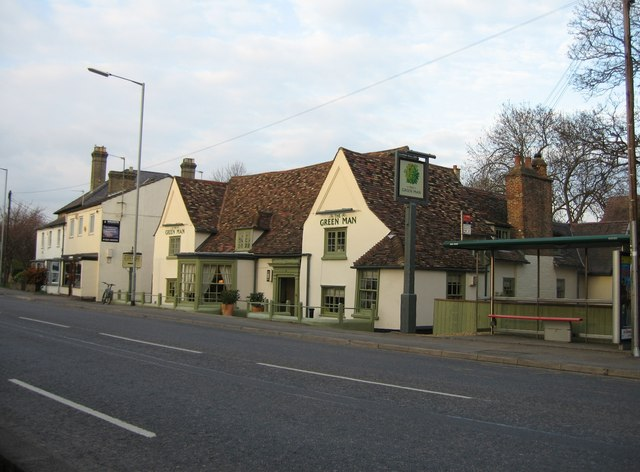
The pub in 2008

The Green Man is a Grade II listed pub in Trumpington, Cambridgeshire, England.

== History ==
The pub has existed since the 15th century. The original timber frame is still standing but has been concealed by later brickwork. The original building included a medieval hall house, which was split into two floors in the 16th century. A bay window facing the road was added later. The pub was extensively redeveloped around 1954. The beer garden can accommodate up to 200 people.

Horse shows were a popular event at the pub during the 1850s. The wit and poet Charles Stuart Calverley is reported to have stolen the pub's sign whilst an undergraduate student at Cambridge. The musician and bandleader Charles Shadwell was landlord of the pub during the 1960s.

The pub has been Grade II listed since 1962.
