= Berwick (Parliament of Scotland constituency) =

Berwick-upon-Tweed
- Former constituency for the Parliament of Scotland

Former constituency
- Abolished: 1482
- Replaced by: Berwick-upon-Tweed

Berwick-upon-Tweed was a constituency of the Parliament of Scotland.

== History ==
Berwick-upon-Tweed was created a royal burgh between 1119 and 1124, and was intermittently represented in Parliament. The burgh is known to have been represented in the meetings of 20 November 1469, 6 May 1471, 6–7 May 1478, 1 March 1479 and 2 April 1481, but the only burgh commissioner whose name is recorded is Archibald Manderston, who attended on 11 April and 13 April 1481.

No commissioner for Berwick-upon-Tweed is listed in the sederunt of 19 March 1482. The burgh was lost to the English later that year, and sent no further representatives to the Scottish parliament. By 1512 the town had been enfranchised and was sending members to the Parliament of England.

== See also ==
- Berwickshire (Parliament of Scotland constituency)
