= HMS Berwick =

Ten ships of the Royal Navy have borne the name HMS Berwick, after Berwick-upon-Tweed, a town on the border between England and Scotland:

- HMS Berwick (1679) was a 70-gun third rate launched in 1679, rebuilt in 1700, hulked in 1715 and broken up in 1742.
- HMS Berwick (1723) was a 70-gun third rate launched in 1723, hulked in 1743 and broken up in 1783.
- HMS Berwick (1743) was a 70-gun third rate launched in 1743 and broken up in 1760.
- HMS Berwick (1775) was a 74-gun third rate launched in 1775. She served in the American War of Independence, fighting at the Battle of Ushant (1778) and the Battle of Dogger Bank (1781). She was captured by the French in 1795, and recaptured at the Battle of Trafalgar, before being wrecked.
- HMS Berwick was a merchantman launched in 1780 that the Navy purchased in 1781 to use as an armed supply ship. The Navy repaired in 1786, classified her as a sixth rate, and renamed her HMS Sirius (1786). She was wrecked in 1790 after participating in the First Fleet, which transported convicts to Botany Bay, in Australia.
- HMS Berwick was previously the Spanish ship San Juan Nepomuceno. She was captured at the Battle of Trafalgar and briefly renamed HMS Berwick. She was then named HMS San Juan and used for harbour service until 1816, before being sold in 1818.
- HMS Berwick (1809) was a 74-gun third rate ship of the line launched in 1809 and broken up in 1821.
- HMS Berwick (1902) was a Monmouth-class armoured cruiser launched in 1902 and scrapped in 1920.
- HMS Berwick (65) was a County-class heavy cruiser launched in 1926 and scrapped in 1948.
- HMS Berwick (F115) was a Rothesay-class frigate launched in 1961 and sunk as a target ship in 1986.

== Battle honours ==
- Barfleur, 1692
- Vigo, 1702
- Gibraltar, 1704
- Velez Malaga, 1704
- Dogger Bank, 1781
- Atlantic, 1939
- Norway, 1940
- Spartivento, 1940
- Arctic, 1941–44
