= Greenman (surname) =

Greenman is a surname. Notable people with the surname include:

- Ben Greenman (born 1969), American writer
- Chris Greenman (born 1968), English footballer
- David Greenman (born 1977), American actor
- Edward W. Greenman (1840–1908), American politician
- Leon Greenman (1910–2008), British anti-fascist
