= The Green Man, Soho =

Pub in London, England

The Green Man
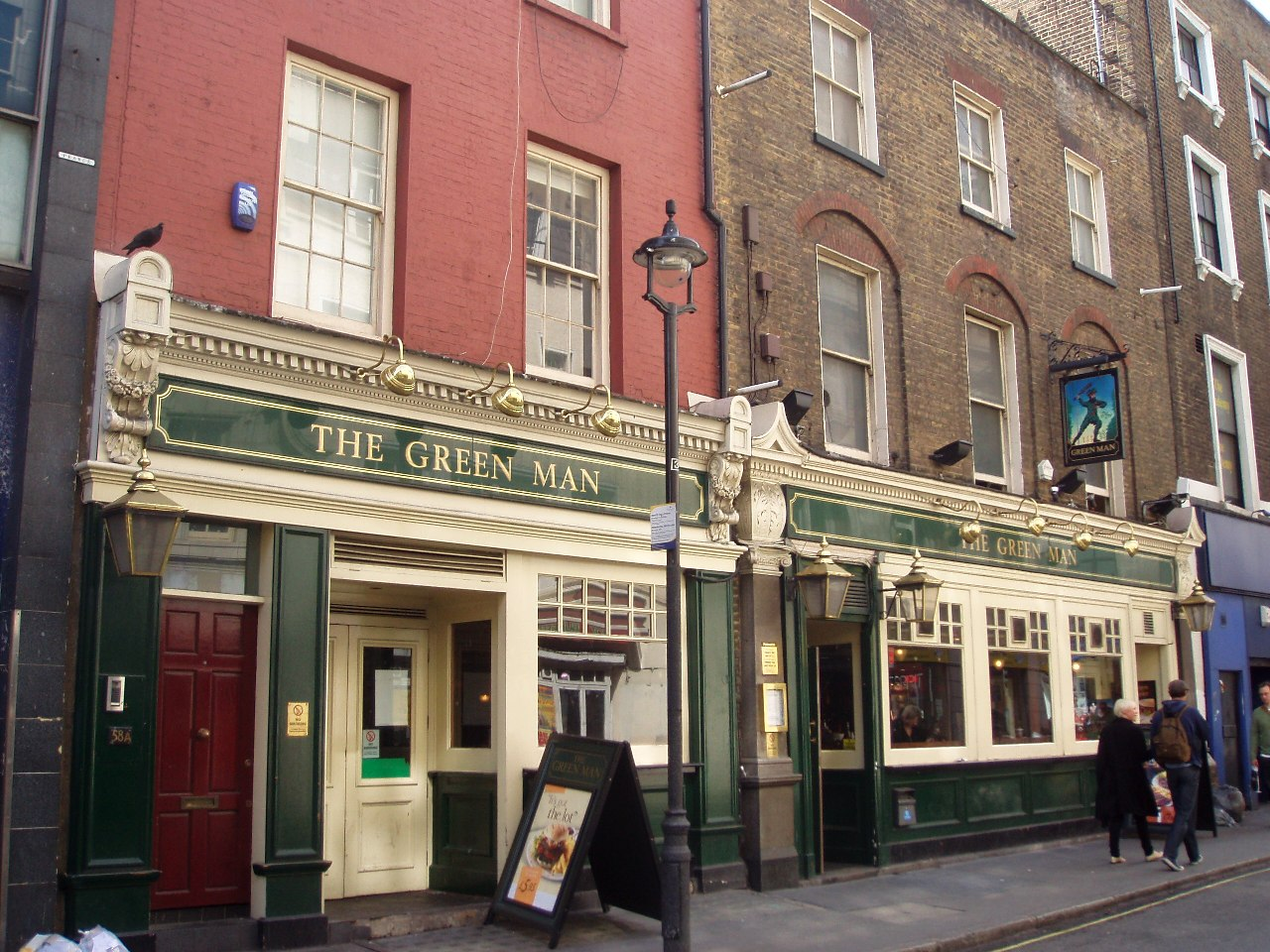
- The pub in 2008
- Location: 57, BERWICK STREET W1
- Coordinates: 51°30′56″N 0°08′12″W
- Built: c. 1738

Listed Building – Grade II
- Official name: GREEN MAN PUBLIC HOUSE
- Designated: 23-Nov-1978
- Reference no.: 1291968

The Green Man is a Grade II listed public house at 57 Berwick Street, in London's Soho.

== History ==
There has been a pub at this location since 1738. It was Grade II listed in 1978.

== Architecture ==
The current premises dates from the early 19th century. The building is constructed from yellow stock brick over three storeys, with a slate roof. A front on the ground floor with granite flanking pilasters was added in the early 20th century. Each of the floors have widely spaces windows with flat gauged arches.

The sign outside the pub depicts a caricature of Hercules with a green club, decorated with leaves.
