= Otago Youth Adventure Trust =

Trust that runs outdoor adventure facilities in New Zealand

- Otago Youth Adventure Trust
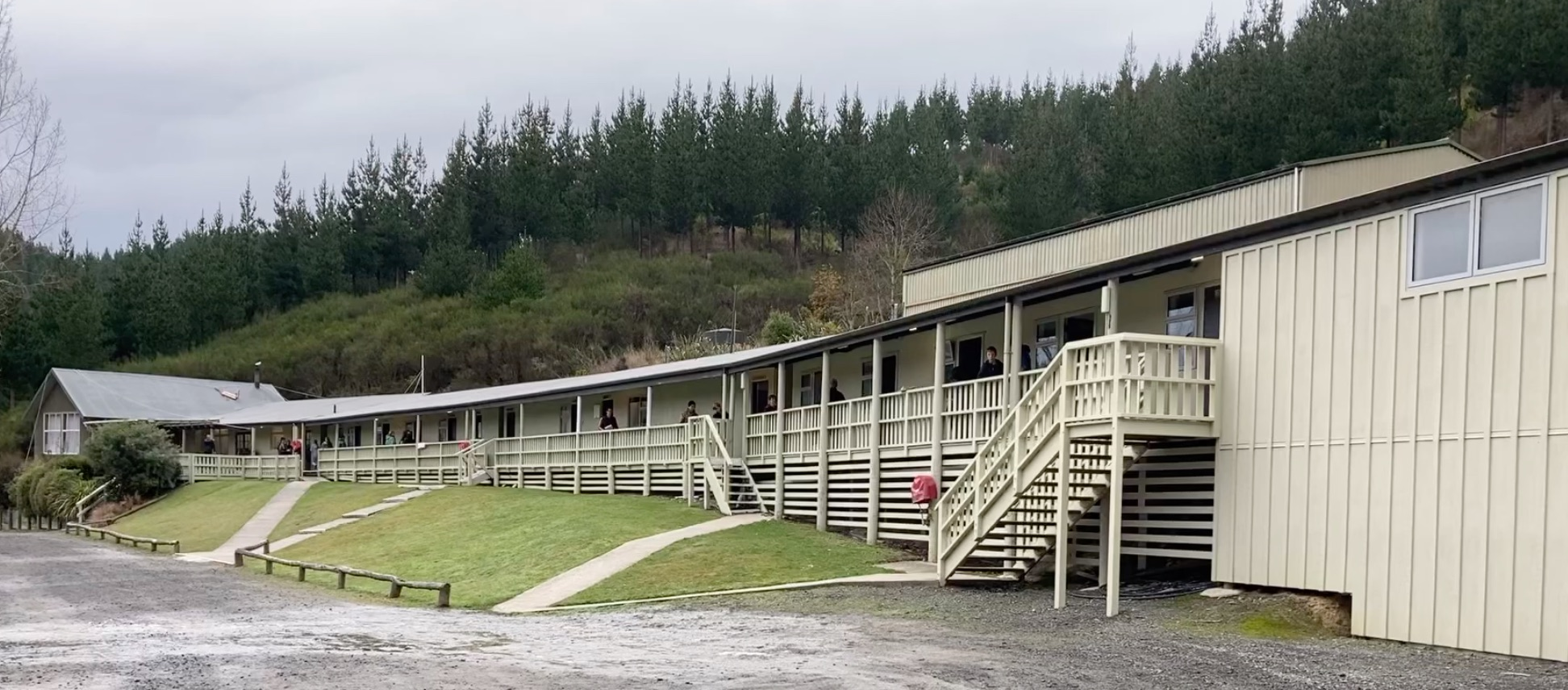
- Main building at Otago Youth Adventure Camp's Berwick Lodge
- Formation: 1968
- Purpose: Outdoor education
- Location: New Zealand
- Website: https://www.youthadventure.org.nz/

Otago Youth Adventure Trust is a trust that operates three outdoor education camps in the Otago region of the South Island of New Zealand. The Trust was established in 1968 and owns Tautuku Outdoor Education Centre near Tautuku Beach in the Catlins, Berwick Lodge in Berwick Forest, Sutton in Middlemarch. The camps are used year-round, and are mostly used by school groups during the week, and are generally available for booking by work places and private groups at the weekend. The Trust is run by volunteers, and relies on donations from Rotary Clubs, Lions Clubs and other similar organisations for funding to maintain the facilities.

== Trust organisation ==
Otago Youth Adventure Trust operates three outdoor education camps in the Otago region of the South Island of New Zealand. The Trust was established in 1968 and owns Tautuku Outdoor Education Centre near Tautuku Beach in the Catlins, Berwick Lodge in Berwick Forest, Sutton in Middlemarch. The camps are used year-round, and are mostly used by school groups during the week, and are generally available for booking by work places and private groups at the weekend.

As of December 2020, the President of the Trust is Simon Woodhead. The Trust is run by volunteers, and relies on donations from Rotary Clubs, Lions Clubs and other similar organisations for funding to maintain the facilities.

== Tautuku Outdoor Education Centre ==
The Tautuku camp, built in the 1970s, accommodates up to 100 people in a mix of dormitories and cabins, and has facilities for abseiling, kayaking, a climbing wall, confidence course, initiative course and tramping tracks. The camp is regularly used by school groups from Dunedin, with Kaikorai Valley College running a camp there for more than 20 years. The camp received a new roof around 2010, which cost over $150,000. In 2012, a girl from St Hilda's Collegiate was the subject of a search-and-rescue operation at the camp after injuring her ankle during a tramp.

== Berwick Lodge ==
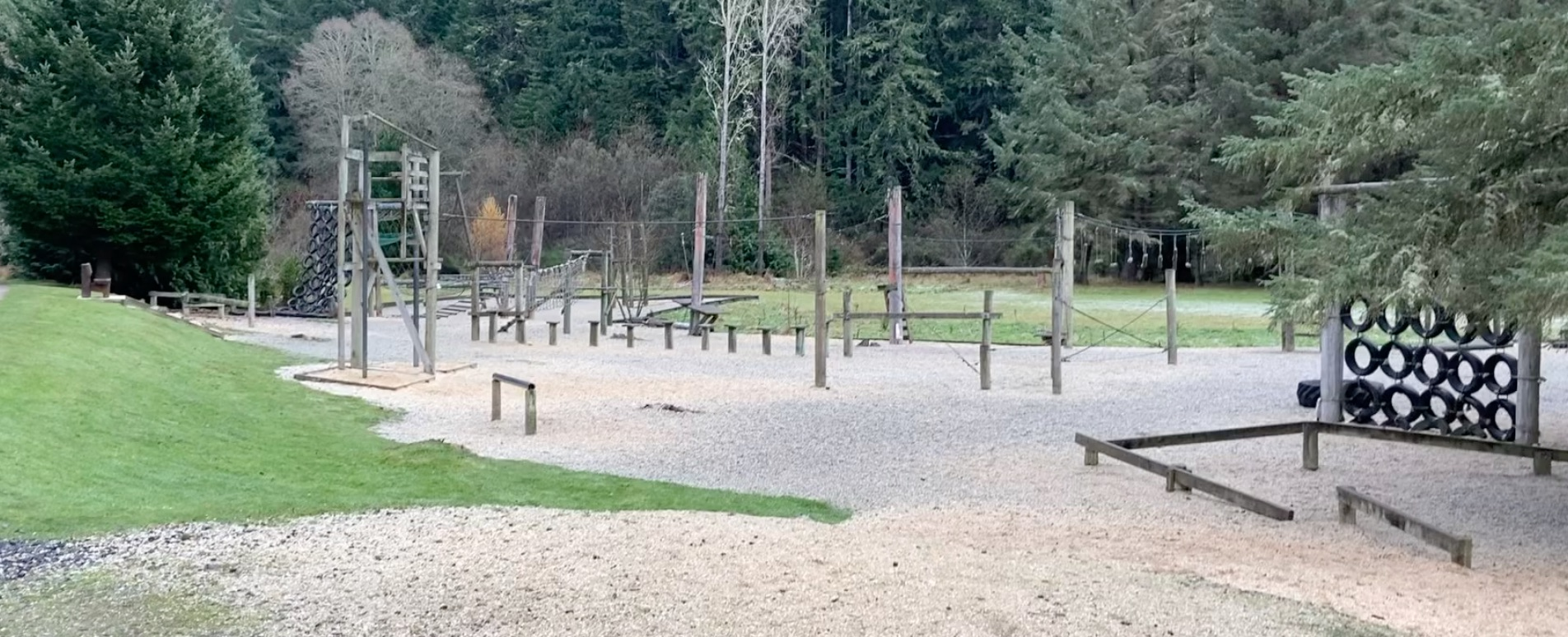
Confidence course at Berwick Lodge

Berwick Lodge is located in Berwick Forest, a large pine plantation near Sinclair Wetlands. It was built in 1983 and as of 2012 was used by approximately 2500 people annually. As of 2021, the camp has accommodation for up to 100 people, and has a confidence course, an assault course, an abseiling wall, a nightline course, archery range, shooting range, flying fox, and sauna. There is also a gymnasium with two climbing walls and a basketball court, a lake for kayaking, walking tracks, and go-karting facilities.

In May 2010, a landslip destroyed nearly a third of the accommodation and facilities at the lodge. New facilities, including 28 new beds in five dormitories, ablution rooms, a staff workshop and a sauna, were completed in May of the following year. However incompatibilities between the new and old fire sprinkler system, and a requirement for further stabilisation and drainage work, and replacement of the water tanks, meant that the facilities were not able to be used immediately and some visiting groups had to camp in tents.

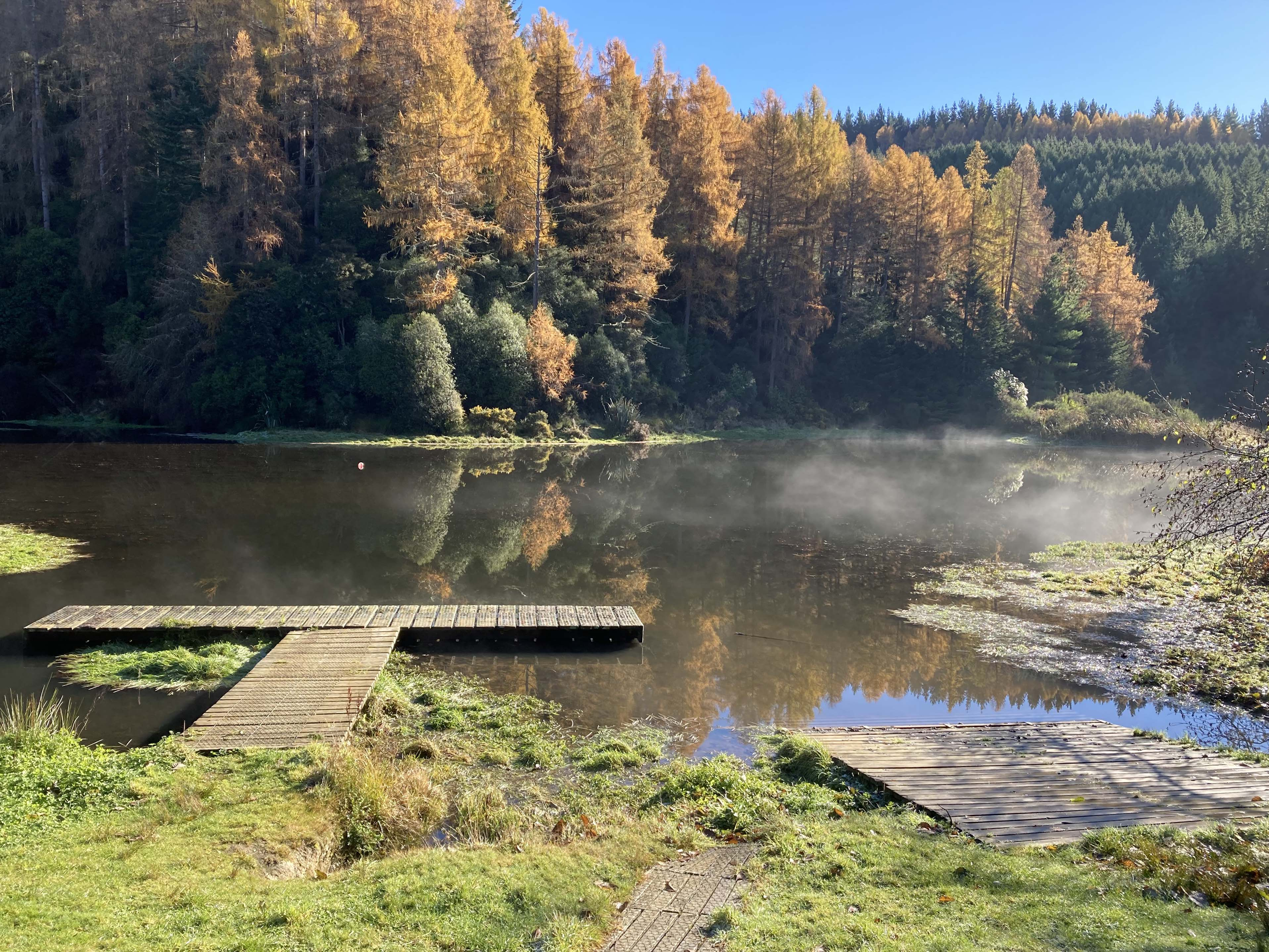
Lake at Berwick Lodge, used for kayaking. The boat ramp is also used as the end of a go-kart run.

Diabetes Otago has been running a four-day camp for children with Type 1 diabetes at Berwick Lodge for more than 20 years.

== Sutton Camp ==
Sutton Camp is set on 2.7 hectares. It sleeps about 25 people, although it has room for an increased number of beds. The camp has a confidence course and a team-building course.

In December 2020 the trust announced it was not taking further bookings for Sutton Camp, and was "reluctantly" putting Sutton Camp on the market. In contrast to Berwick Lodge and Tautuku, Sutton Camp was acquired by the Trust rather than being purpose-built. A group of Middlemarch residents announced in January 2021 that they were investigating purchasing the camp to retain it as a community facility.
