= Berwick Street Market =

Street market in the City of Westminster, London, England

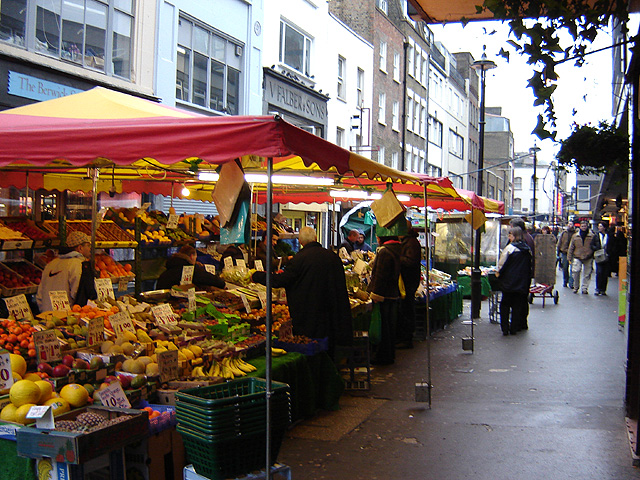
- Berwick Street Market in 2006
- Location: Berwick Street, Soho; Berwick Street, Soho; 51.512921°N 0.134365°W
- Opening date: 1842 (184 years ago)
- Management: City of Westminster
- Owner: City of Westminster
- Environment: Outdoor
- Goods sold: Street food, fruit & veg, household goods, fashion
- Days normally open: Monday to Saturday
- Number of tenants: 40
- Website: westminster.gov.uk/licensing/markets-and-street-trading
- Location within City of Westminster

Berwick Street Market is an outdoor street market in the Soho area of the City of Westminster. It takes place on Berwick Street. Licences to trade are issued by Westminster City Council.

== History ==
Before 1867 street trading in London was regarded as a common-law right in London. After being banned for a few weeks in late 1867 street trading was regulated by the police with no licensing or regulation other than the size and spacing of pitches. This light-touch regime continued until the London County Council (General Powers) Act 1927 replaced police regulation with a new licensing regime administered by metropolitan borough councils.

From 1867 until 1927, street trading was regulated by the police with no licensing or regulation other than the size and spacing of pitches.

In 1893 the London County Council's Public Control Committee stated that the Market had existed since at least 1842 (though it is not listed in Mayhew) between Broad Street and Peter Street and that the market included Walker's Court which continues Berwick Street south down to Brewer Street.

At that time there were 32 traders on a Saturday with 20 on weekdays, with the costermongers occupying the west side of the street. Many of the traders had relocated from Seven Dials during the construction of Shaftesbury Avenue. The market was then predominately fresh produce for home and commercial kitchens.

The Saturday traders are summarised as:

Perishable goods
Commodity	Number
Vegetables	9
Butchers' meat	4
Fruit	1
Flowers	1
Fish	4
Cheesemonger	1
Eggs	1
Catsmeat	2

Non-perishable goods
Commodity	Number
Earthenware	3
Haberdashery	4
Ironmongery	1
Old books	1

According to the Public Control Committee, the vestry was opposed to registering or licensing the traders.

The local vestry was of the opinion that the market should be open to all goods except secondhand clothes as they were concerned about infectious diseases following the 1854 Broad Street cholera outbreak.

In the early 1920s Virginia Woolf often frequented the market and prided herself in her ability to haggle over silk stockings with the market traders who were described at the time as "cosmopolitan—French, Swiss, Italian, Greek and suburban."

Mary Benedetta describes the 1936 market as being quiet compared to a post first world war peak. The fruiterer Jack Smith still held a regular pitch where he would remind customers and of his claim that in 1880 he was the first person in England to retail tomatoes and in 1890 the first to retail grapefruit.

Between the wars the market became renowned for chintzes, satins, furs, and fine silk stockings servicing the theatres and caberets of the West End. Despite this change in emphasis, fresh food remained a presence on the market. It was during the interwar period that Berwick Street became one of the first street markets in London to have an electricity supply for traders to illuminate their stalls.

Following the second world war an explosion of department stores along Oxford Street poached the millinery trade away from the market and returned to its late nineteenth century focus of fresh food.

By the mid-nineties the market consisted of over eighty stalls until in 1995 Westminster Council restricted the market to the east side of the street only gradually reducing the number of pitches to 41 through closing the market to new traders.

In the middle of the 2010s Westminster City Council considered turning the market over to a private operator but abandoned the plans following a campaign by local residents and traders and a petition signed by 37,000 people including Joanna Lumley and Stephen Fry.

== Transport ==
=== Bus ===
12, 159, 188, 390, and 453.

=== Railway and tube ===
The nearest stations are Tottenham Court Road, Oxford Circus, and Piccadilly Circus.
