= Karl Peglau =

German engineer and traffic psychologist

- Born: 18 May 1927; Muskau, Weimar Republic
- Died: 29 November 2009 (aged 82); Berlin, Germany
- Occupations: Traffic psychologist and engineer

Karl Peglau (18 May 1927 – 29 November 2009) was a German traffic psychologist who invented the iconic Ampelmännchen traffic symbols used in the former East Germany in 1961. The Ampelmännchen depicts a symbolic person on the red and green pedestrian traffic lights.

Peglau wanted to create a traffic light that would be both appealing to children, yet easily accessible and understandable for elderly Germans. He deliberately designed the human figures, known as the Ampelmännchen, to be both creative and "cute".

The Ampelmännchen, which is widely beloved in the former German Democratic Republic, is one of the symbols which still "enjoy the privileged status of being one of the few features of East Germany to have survived the end of the Iron Curtain with his popularity unscathed." Fans of Peglau's have used it to symbolize the so-called Ostalgie, or revival of East German aesthetic as trendy and chic.

In 1997, the German government attempted to replace the Ampelmännchen used in the former East Germany with the slighter, more generic version used in the former West Germany. A campaign, called Save the Ampelmännchen, was launched by supporters, which successfully preserved Peglau's Ampelmännchen in the East.

== Biography ==
=== Early life ===
Karl Peglau was born in the town of Muskau, Upper Lusatia in 1927. He trained and studied in both engineering and psychology at Humboldt University of Berlin.

=== Ampelmännchen in East Germany ===
The green and red Ampelmännchen, designed by Peglau

By the early 1960s, traffic lights in the former German Democratic Republic had remained largely unchanged since the 1930s. An increase in cars and traffic volume in the communist-ruled East Germany had made the streets more dangerous for both drivers and pedestrians. The 1930s-era traffic lights could not cope with the increased traffic, leading to a sharp rise in accidents and fatalities.

In the early 1960s, an East Berlin traffic commission asked Peglau to create a new traffic light design in order to decrease the number of traffic accidents in the city. Peglau concluded that both vehicle and pedestrian traffic could be better managed if he created a completely different traffic signal.

Peglau designed the glass human figures for the stop (red) and go (green) lights on the traffic signal in 1961, which became known as the Ampelmännchen. Peglau deliberately designed the Ampelmännchen to be both friendly and approachable, which increased their popularity with East Germans. The figures were created with easy-going stances, hats, "button noses" and "stocky builds". Peglau described the Ampelmännchen's features as having the ability to project "an aura of coziness and human warmth".

Peglau also designed the Ampelmännchen to be more effective and practical than the previous 1930s-era signals. The green Ampelmännchen's stance resembled an arrow, while the red Ampelmännchen, with his outstretched arms, looks similar to a barricade. The large Ampelmännchen symbols made them easier to see in poor weather.

Peglau's Ampelmännchen spread beyond East Berlin and became common throughout East Germany by the 1980s. They became an important part of East German popular culture, and were used to teach children about the importance of traffic rules and safety.

=== Reunification and later years ===
After German reunification in 1990, the German authorities began to gradually phase out Paglau's iconic Ampelmännchen in favour of a slimmer signal used in the former West Germany. A German designer, Markus Heckhausen, began to collect the old Ampelmännchen, which had been replaced by the authorities. Heckhausen turned the old Ampelmännchen figures into lamps and fashion accessories. A campaign, called Save the Ampelmännchen, was launched by the public and Ampelmännchen enthusiasts, resulting in the preservation of Peglau's Ampelmännchen in 1997.

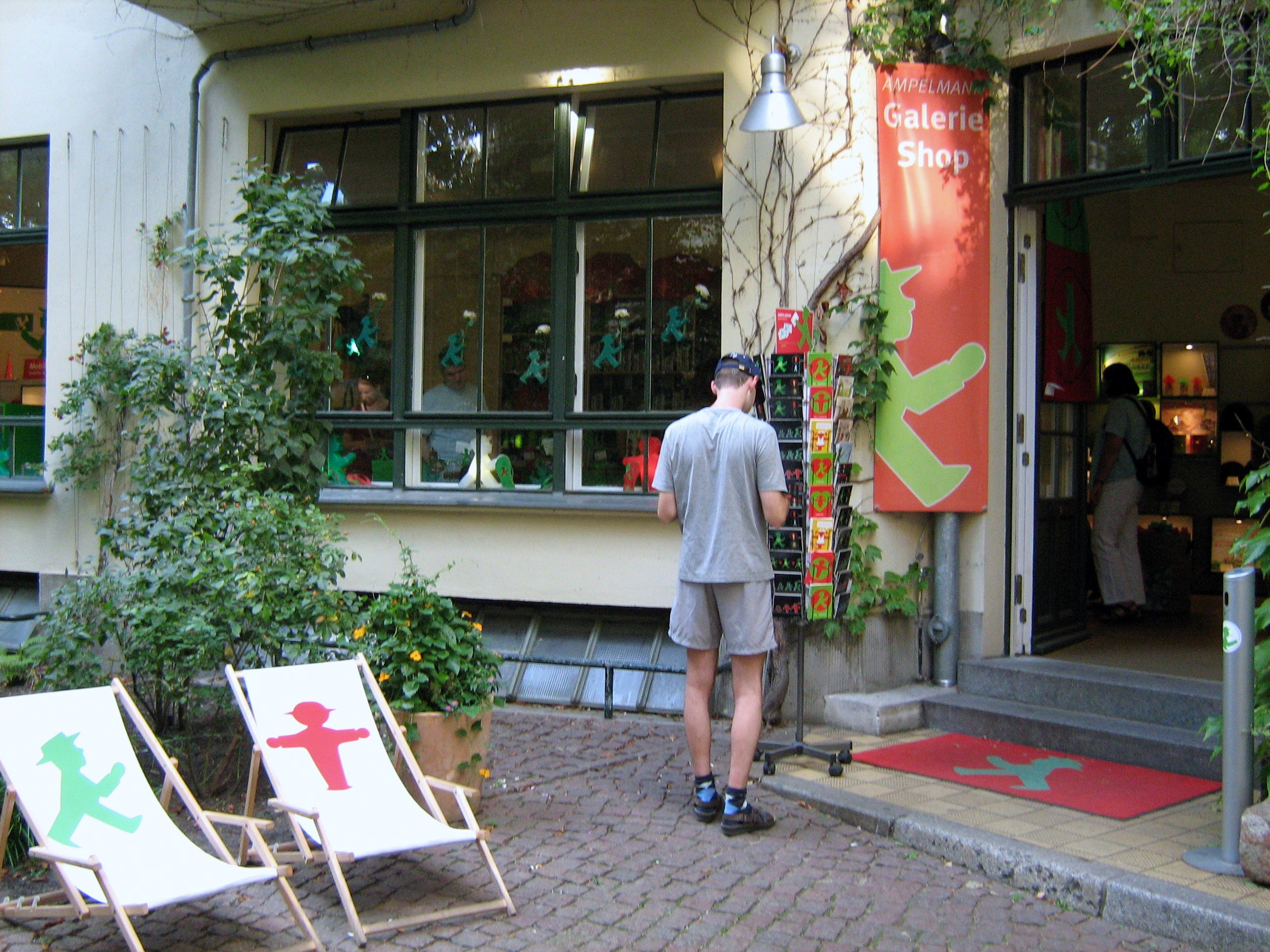
Ampelmännchen shop in Berlin, with products based on Peglau's original designs

In 1996, Heckhausen won the copyright to sell and market Peglau's Ampelmännchen design and started a firm called Ampelmann Ltd. Heckhausen quickly hired Peglau to design new Ampelmännchen products for the company, which have since become some of the most popular souvenirs in Berlin. In an interview with the Berliner Zeitung, Heckhausen recalled that Peglau would come to the Ampelmann Ltd. design studio once a week to brainstorm on new products and work with other staff. Heckhausen stated that Peglau found it unusual that the company was able to create consumer products, such as T-shirts and bags, out of his traffic safety ideas.

Peglau spent nearly 20 years following the fall of the Berlin Wall and the reunification of Germany working on his iconic Ampelmännchen designs. However, as a traffic psychologist and engineer, Peglau designed numerous other traffic safety plans throughout his career. For example, Peglau proposed that the red, yellow and green lights each be assigned a different shape.

As of late 2009, Peglau's Ampelmännchen can still be found throughout secondary road and intersections within the former East Germany. His symbols have also been adopted by some former West German cities as well.

Karl Peglau died in Berlin, Germany, on 29 November 2009, at the age of 82. He was survived by his wife, Hildegard, and their two children.
