= Glynde railway station =

Railway station in East Sussex, England

Coordinates: 50.859°N 0.070°E

Glynde
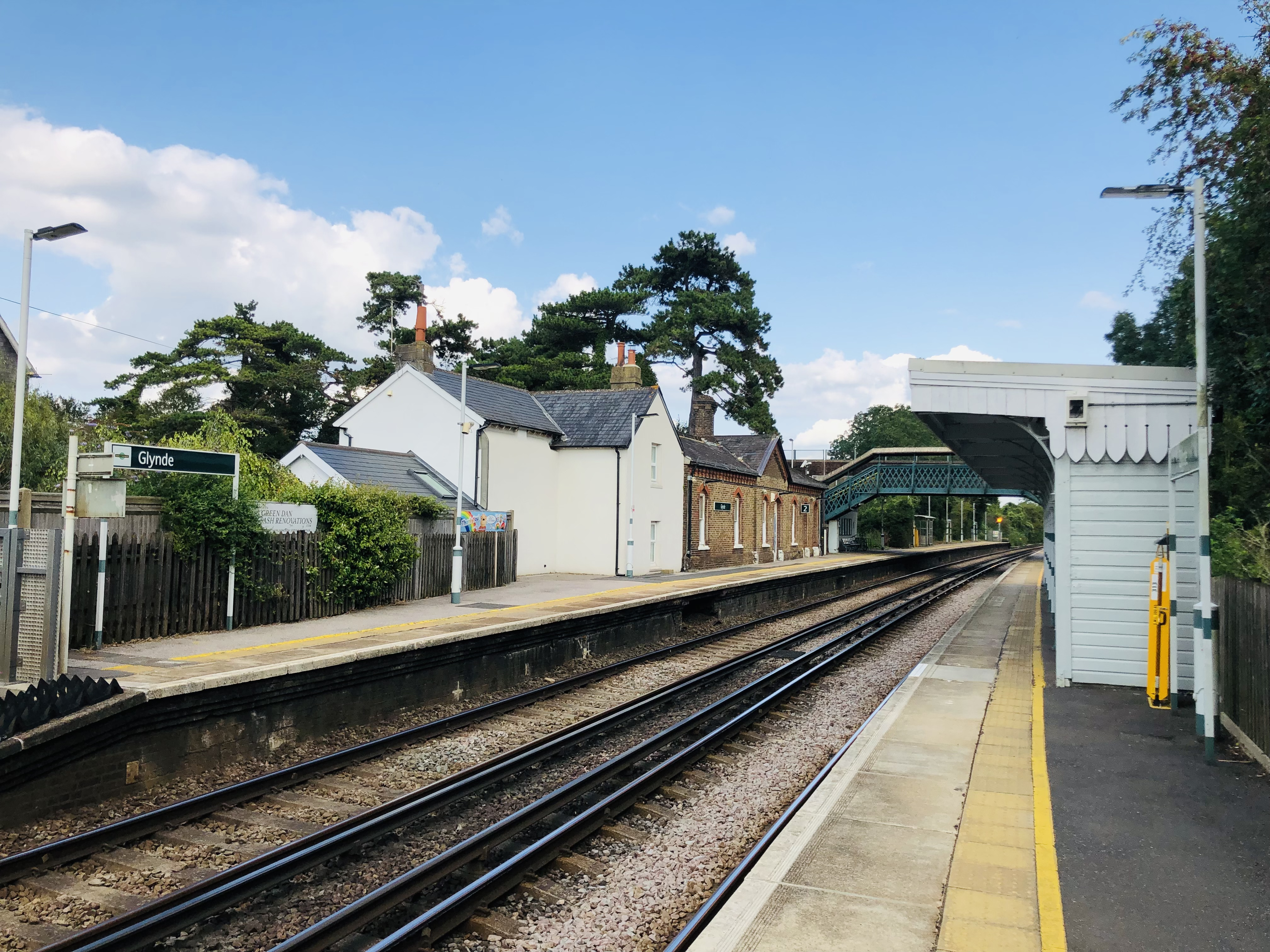

General information
- Location: Glynde, Lewes; England
- Grid reference: TQ458086
- Manager: Southern
- Platforms: 2

Other information
- Station code: GLY
- Classification: DfT category F1

History
- Opened: 1846

Passengers
- 2020/21: ▼20,492
- 2021/22: ▲51,232
- 2022/23: ▲60,526
- 2023/24: ▲62,362
- 2024/25: ▲68,736
Location
Notes
- Passenger statistics from the Office of Rail and Road

Glynde railway station serves Glynde in East Sussex. It is 53 miles 11 chains (85.5 km) from London Bridge, on the East Coastway Line and train services are provided by Southern.

== History ==
The station was opened 27 June 1846 by the Brighton, Lewes and Hastings Railway when that railway opened its line from Lewes to Bulverhithe, originally as a single line. The line was doubled during early 1847.

== Current status ==
The station is unstaffed and a PERTIS Permit to travel machine was installed in 2008, in connection with a Penalty Fares Scheme. This has since been replaced by a Shere self-service ticket machine.

The station is located near to the Glyndebourne Opera House, although better connections to the opera house are available from Lewes, from which shuttle buses run.

The former Station building is occupied by Airworks paragliding school.

== Services ==
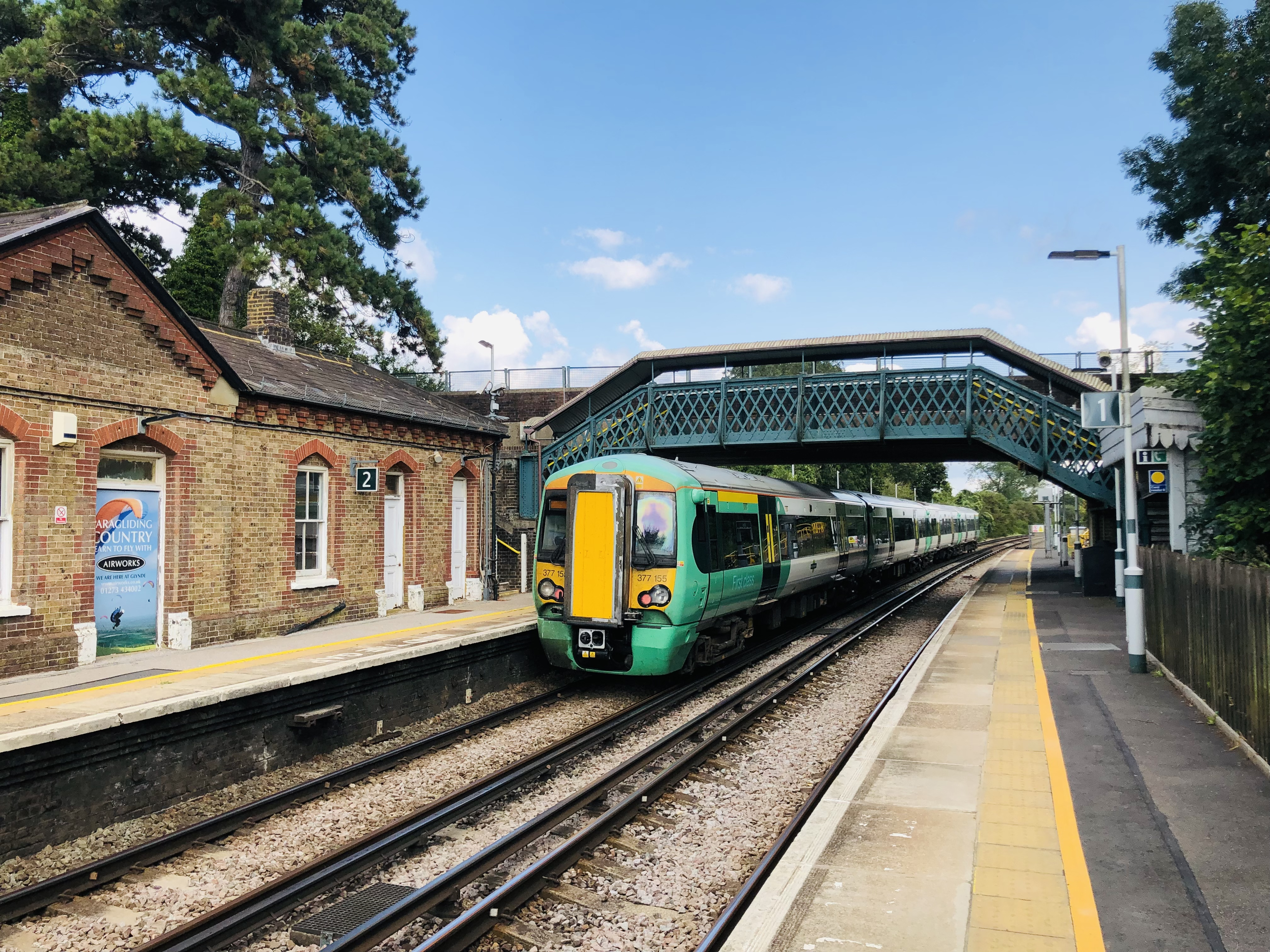
377155 at Glynde with a Southern service bound for Ore

All services at Glynde are operated by Southern using Class 377 and Class 387 EMUs.

The typical off-peak service in trains per hour is:

- 1 tph to Brighton via Lewes
- 1 tph to Eastbourne

Additional services between Brighton, Hastings and Ore call at the station during the peak hours, as well as some morning services to London Victoria and some evening services to Eastbourne.

Preceding station	National Rail	Following station
Lewes	Southern East Coastway Line	Berwick

== Accidents and incidents ==
On 4 January 1887, a passenger train crashed into a stray wagon that had toppled over onto the main line during shunting operations. It is not clear how the wagon had toppled over. A guard on the passenger train sustained broken ribs.
