= The Green Man, Hatfield =

Pub in Hatfield, Hertfordshire, England

Coordinates: 51°46′23″N 0°12′10″W

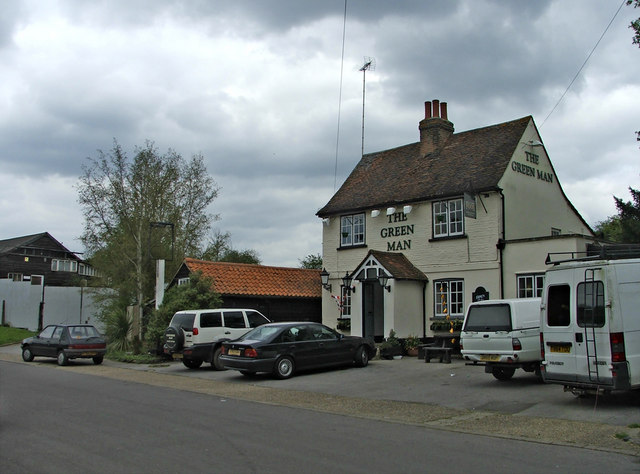
The Green Man

The Green Man is a grade II listed public house in Mill Green Lane, Hatfield, Hertfordshire, England. The building is based on a seventeenth-century timber frame with later additions.

It closed in 2011, underwent substantial renovation and lies vacant.
