= Green Man (guild emblem) =

Figure associated with the Pyrotechnics Guild International

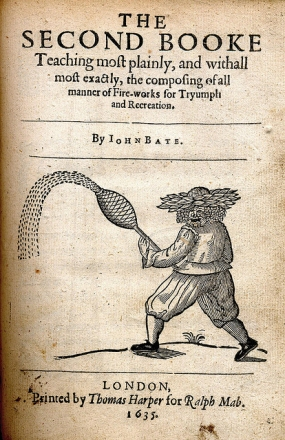
The Green Man on the title page of John Bate's The Second Booke

The Green Man is a figure associated with the Pyrotechnics Guild International (PGI). He appears on the Guild's emblem and was selected from John Bate's 1635 fireworks treatise The Second Booke, to symbolize the long tradition of using fireworks as a part of festivals and celebrations - at that time led by so-called "Green Men" appointed to head processions with a "Fire Club" shooting sparks. They were called Green Men because they clothed themselves with fresh leaves to protect themselves from sparks produced by their hand-held fireworks. This gave rise to the traditional salutation "stay green" amongst those involved with fireworks.
