= Treaty of Berwick =

Treaty of Berwick may refer to:

- Treaty of Berwick (1357), a treaty between Edward III of England and David II of Scotland for David's release
- Treaty of Berwick (1526), a treaty between the Earl of Angus and England
- Treaty of Berwick (1560), a treaty between the Duc du Chatelherault and Queen Elizabeth I to expel the French from Scotland
- Treaty of Berwick (1586), a mutual defence agreement between Queen Elizabeth I of England and King James VI of Scotland
- Treaty of Berwick (1639), a treaty between England and Scotland ending the First Bishops' War
