= Berwick railway station (East Sussex) =

Railway station in East Sussex, England

Berwick (Sussex)
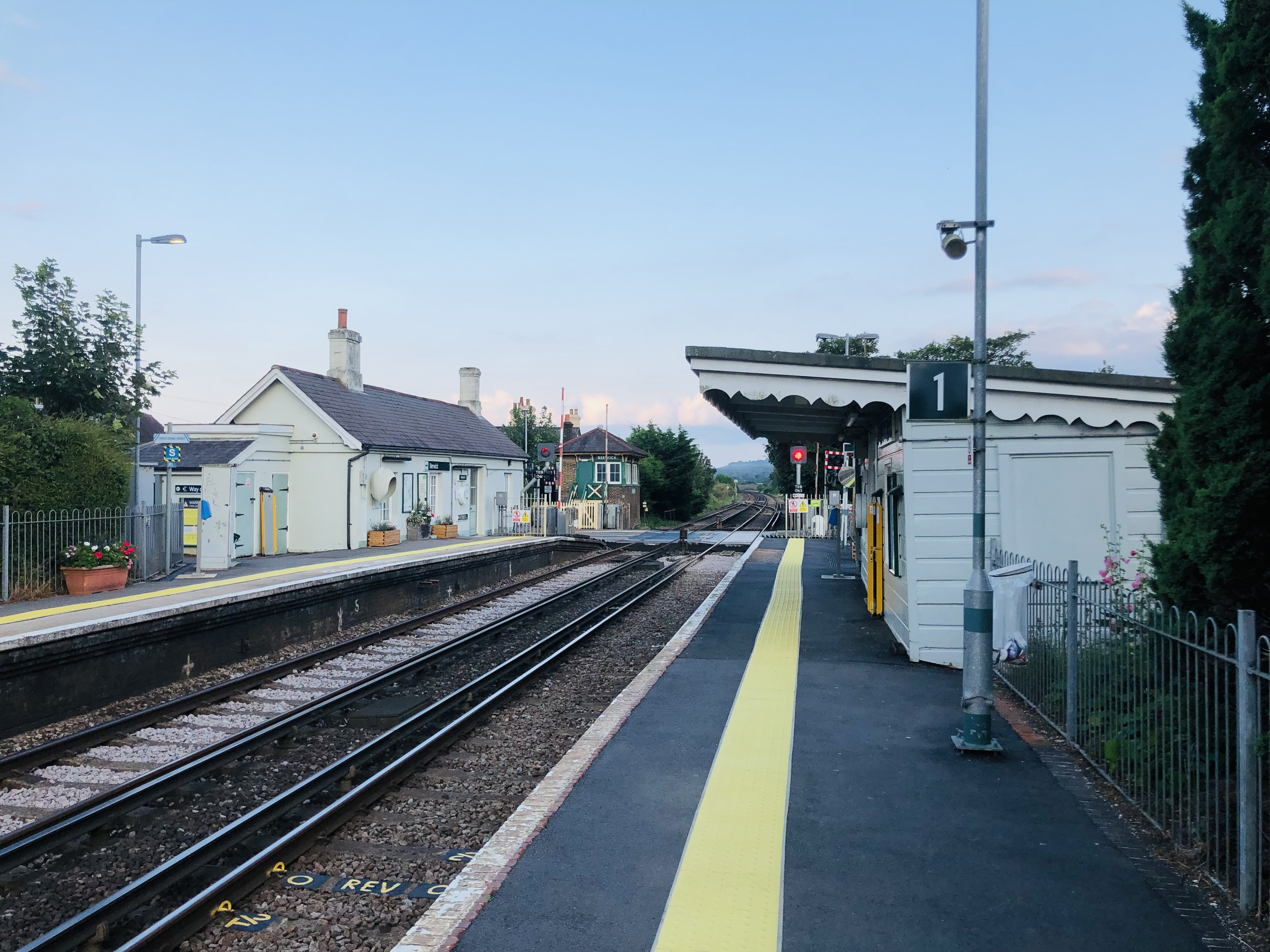
- The platforms at Berwick, looking east

General information
- Location: Berwick, Wealden, East Sussex; England
- Coordinates: 50.840°N 0.166°E
- Grid reference: TQ525067
- Manager: Southern
- Platforms: 2

Other information
- Station code: BRK
- Classification: DfT category E

History
- Original company: London and Brighton Railway
- Pre-grouping: London, Brighton and South Coast Railway
- Post-grouping: Southern Railway

Key dates
- 27 June 1846: Station opened

Passengers
- 2020/21: ▼24,508
- 2021/22: ▲67,324
- 2022/23: ▲71,168
- 2023/24: ▲73,830
- 2024/25: ▲79,434
Location
Notes
- Passenger statistics from the Office of Rail and Road

Berwick railway station is located in Berwick, East Sussex, England. Berwick village is located nearby to the south of the A27 road.

The station is on the East Coastway Line, 57 miles 47 chains (92.7 km) from London Bridge, and train services are provided by Southern.

== History ==
The station was opened by the London and Brighton Railway on 27 June 1846, and was extended in 1890. The neighbouring station cottages were built between 1846 and 1892. The English Heritage report describes this station as 'in all one of the most complete wayside country station ensembles.'

== Signal box ==
The Berwick signal box was a Saxby & Farmer Type 5 box, erected in 1879 and retained its original lever frame and semaphore signalling. Following an upgrade by Network Rail, the box was closed in February 2015, with the area now controlled from Sussex Regional Operations Centre at Three Bridges.

== Services ==
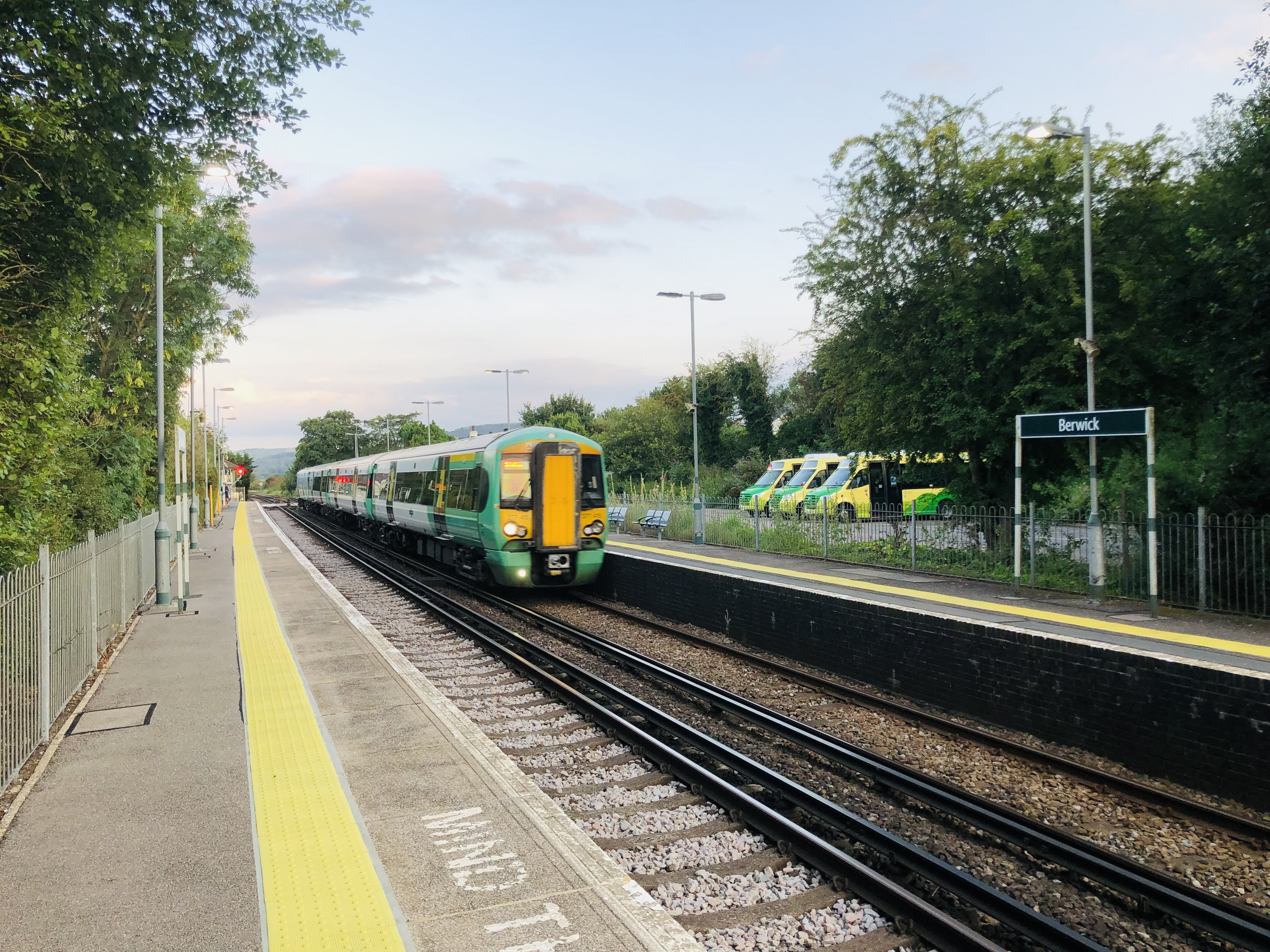
377415 passing through Berwick with a Southern service to Brighton

All services at Berwick are operated by Southern using Class 377 EMUs.

The typical off-peak service in trains per hour is:

- 1 tph to Brighton via Lewes
- 1 tph to Eastbourne

Additional services between Brighton, Hastings and Ore call at the station during the peak hours, as well as some morning services to London Victoria and some evening services to Eastbourne.

| Preceding station | National Rail | Following station |
|---|---|---|
| Glynde | Southern East Coastway Line | Polegate |

== Gallery ==
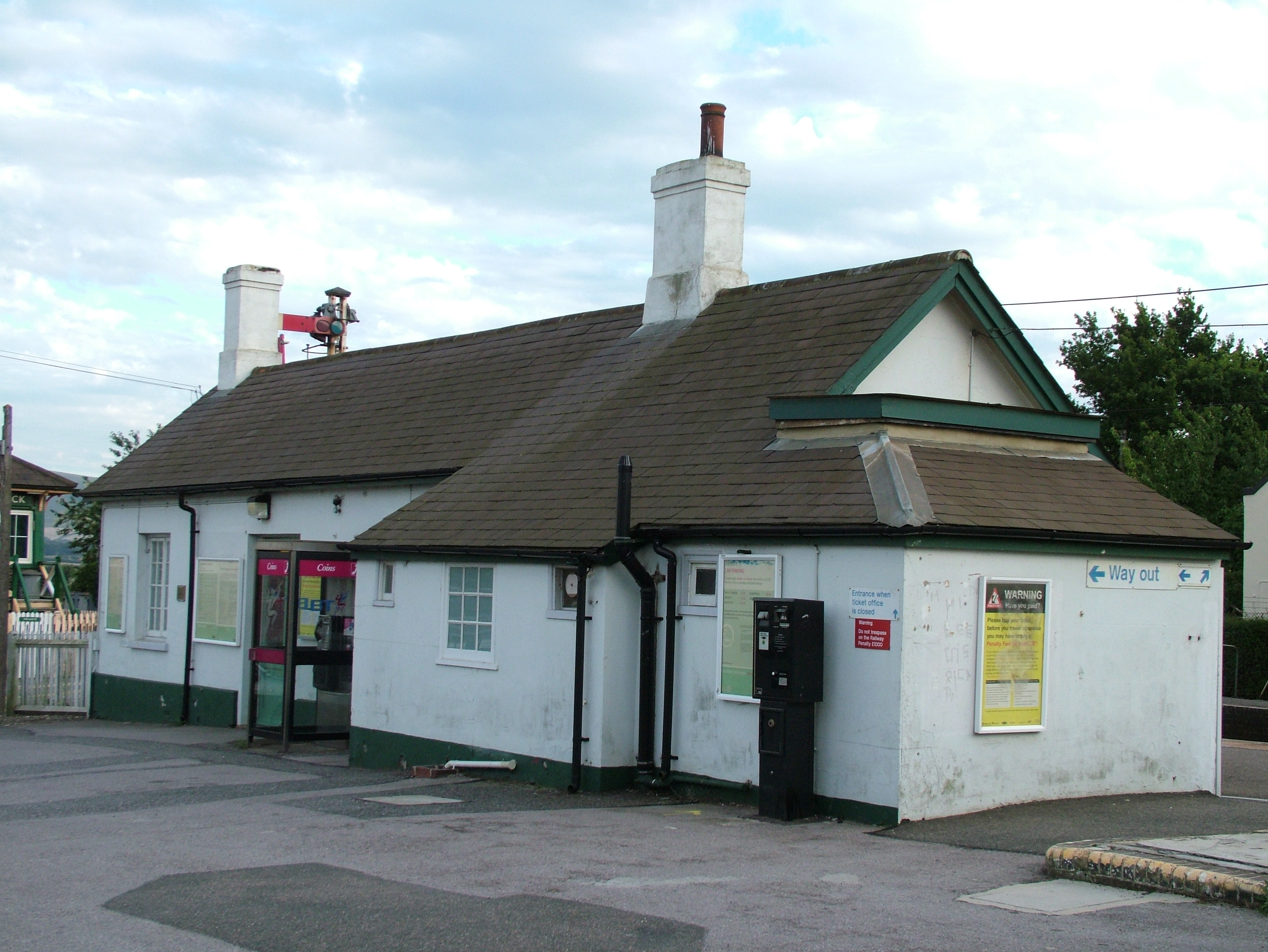
The station building on platform 2, seen from the station approach

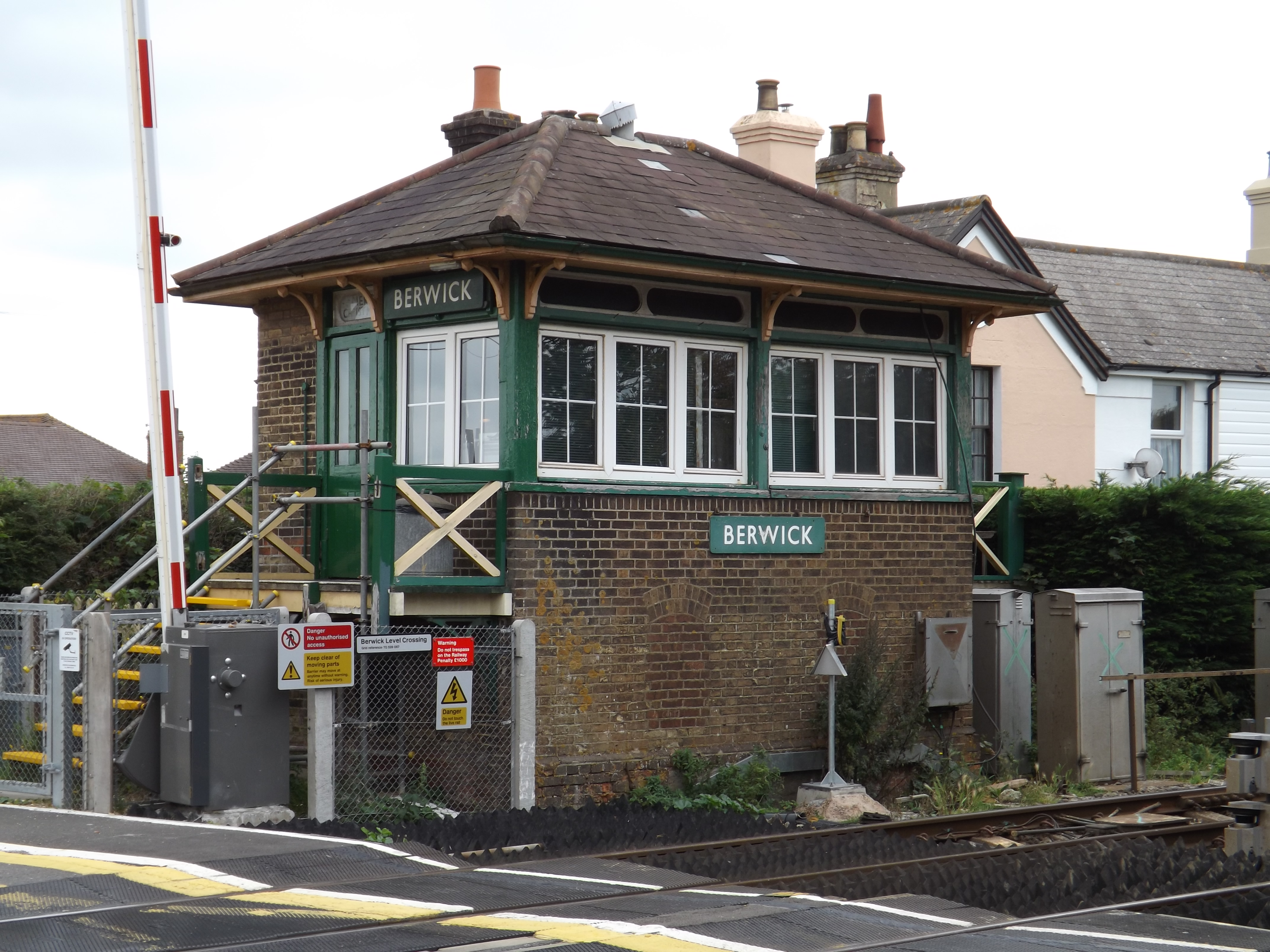
The signal box

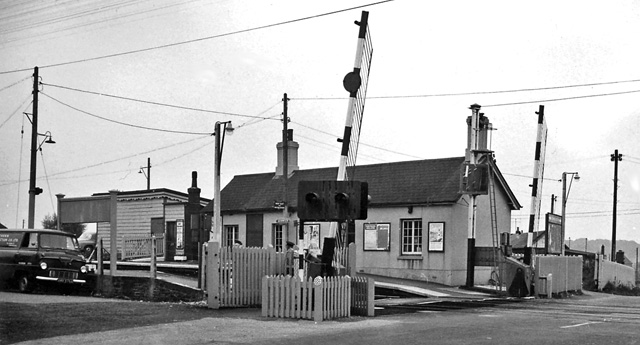
The station in 1964

== See also ==
- Berwick-upon-Tweed railway station
- North Berwick railway station
- Cuckmere Brickworks railway
