= Hellingly railway station =

Railway station in Hellingly, East Sussex, England

Coordinates: 50°53′10″N 0°15′05″E

Hellingly
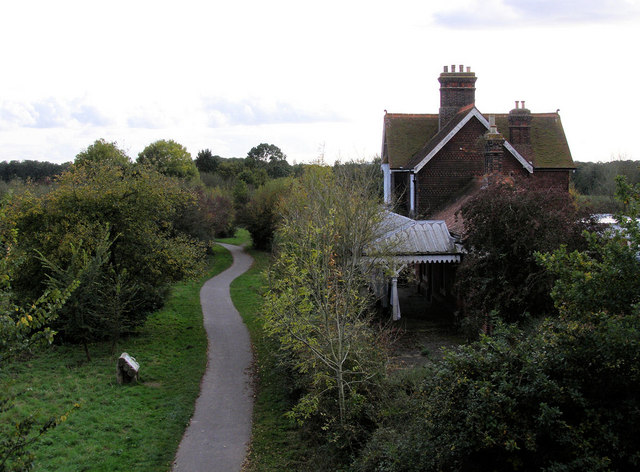

General information
- Location: Hellingly, Wealden; England
- Grid reference: TQ584120
- Platforms: 1

Other information
- Status: Disused

History
- Pre-grouping: London, Brighton and South Coast Railway
- Post-grouping: Southern Railway; Southern Region of British Railways

Key dates
- 5 April 1880: Station opened
- 14 June 1965: Station closed to passengers
Location

Hellingly was a railway station on the now closed Polegate to Eridge line (the Cuckoo Line) in East Sussex. It served the village of Hellingly.

== History ==
The station was opened by the London, Brighton and South Coast Railway on 5 April 1880 It was on the line extension from Hailsham to Eridge. The station closed to passenger traffic on 14 June 1965 but freight trains continued to pass through until 1968 when the line was closed completely.

== Hellingly Hospital Railway ==
There was also a separate platform for passengers visiting Hellingly Hospital by tram, until 1933, the passenger service via Tramcar being discontinued from 1931. The line, known as the Hellingly Hospital Railway continued in use for transporting coal wagons from Hellingly Station for use at the hospital until 1959.

== Film ==
The station featured in the 1964 film Smokescreen. The two investigators visited the station and met the station master, who said that the whole line would be closed the following year. There are some excellent shots along the platform towards the road bridge. Also clearly visible is one of the 3-car stop marks put in on this line for the Class 207 'Oxted' diesel units.

== Present day ==
The station building survives today as a private residence, complete with canopy. The "Cuckoo Trail" public footpath and cycleway now runs along the trackbed.

Preceding station	Disused railways	Following station
Horam; Line and station closed	British Rail; Southern Region; Cuckoo Line	Hailsham; Line and station closed

== See also ==
- List of closed railway stations in Britain
