= Eastbourne railway station =

Railway station in East Sussex, England

Coordinates: 50.769°N 0.281°E

Eastbourne

General information
- Location: Eastbourne, Borough of Eastbourne; England
- Grid reference: TV609991
- Manager: Southern
- Platforms: 3

Other information
- Station code: EBN
- Classification: DfT category C1

Key dates
- 1849: Opened
- 1866: Rebuilt
- 1872: Resited
- 1886: Rebuilt

Passengers
- 2020/21: ▼1.188 million
- Interchange: ▼12,344
- 2021/22: ▲2.696 million
- Interchange: ▲35,101
- 2022/23: ▲3.202 million
- Interchange: ▲39,871
- 2023/24: ▲3.481 million
- Interchange: ▼18,408
- 2024/25: ▲3.755 million
- Interchange: ▲19,619

Listed Building – Grade II
- Feature: Eastbourne Railway Station
- Designated: 3 July 1981
- Reference no.: 1262160
Location
Notes
- Passenger statistics from the Office of Rail and Road

Eastbourne railway station serves the seaside town of Eastbourne in East Sussex, England. It is on the East Coastway Line. The station is managed by Southern, who operate all trains serving it. It is one of two railway stations in the town, the other being Hampden Park Station. There are also two other stations in the Eastbourne area, one being Pevensey & Westham, in nearby Westham (near Pevensey), the other being Polegate.

Most passenger services along the coast served the station, as they do today. Trains reverse at the station to continue their journey along the East Coastway by using a junction north of Hampden Park railway station; services run either east (to Bexhill, Hastings and Ashford International) or west via Lewes (to Brighton or London Victoria) from the station.

== History ==
The single-track branch line to Eastbourne from Polegate on the Brighton to Hastings line was opened by the London Brighton and South Coast Railway (LB&SCR) on 14 May 1849. As the town became an ever more popular seaside resort two further stations followed: the first in 1866 and the present station, designed by F.D. Brick, in 1886. There was a rarely used triangular junction between Polegate and the now-closed Stone Cross which allowed trains to bypass the Branch; the track for this has now been lifted.

=== First station ===
Very little is known about the first railway station, except that it was a timber structure said to be located on Upperton Road, somewhere between the current station and the Royal Mail sorting office, and was in use from 1849. When the station was rebuilt in 1866, the old station building was moved to Wharf Road, where it was converted into a dwelling for railway families. There is no information available about the number of platforms it had.

=== Present station ===
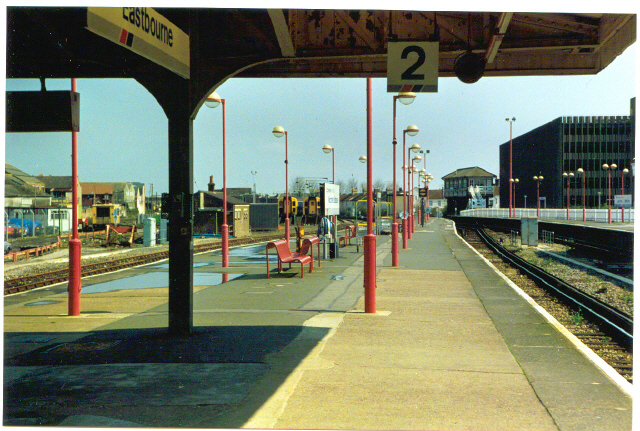
Eastbourne in 1994

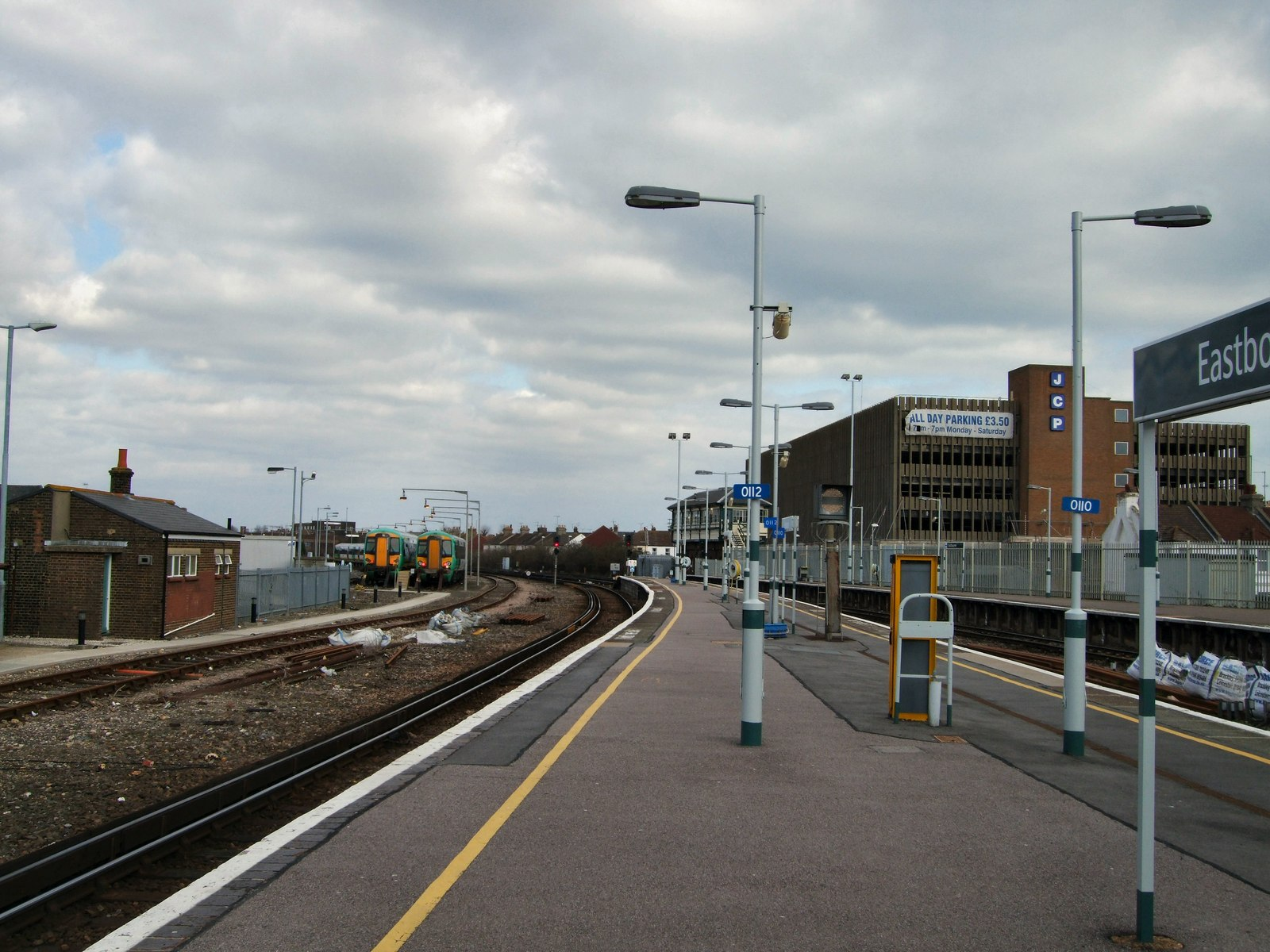
Eastbourne in 2006

In 1872, due to the increase in services serving Eastbourne, which had become a popular resort, the station was relocated a little to the east under the supervision of LB&SCR Chief Engineer Frederick Banister. In 1886 the station was rebuilt to designs by F.D. Brick. The rebuilt structure featured a vaulted canopy and lantern roof, similar to that of Lewes. It originally had four platforms, which increased in length over the years. Between platforms 2 and 3, there were also two run-around loops. However, over time, one of these loops was lost as platforms 1 and 2 were expanded. On 12 April 1977, platform 4 was shortened from a 12-coach to an 8-coach length to accommodate the ring road construction. It was later taken out of use and the track was lifted during the Eastbourne re-signalling in 1991.

=== Goods station and yards ===
A goods station and yard were constructed to the north of the current station, on the site of the first station. It was accessed from the mainline. Also to the north was an extensive coal depot, and industrial sidings, including the Crumbles siding. The goods shed still stands today as the Enterprise Shopping Centre, and the former goods yard surrounding it has been converted into a station car park. The site of the former coal sidings that used to be situated northeast of the station is now occupied by a car dealership.

=== Locomotive depot ===
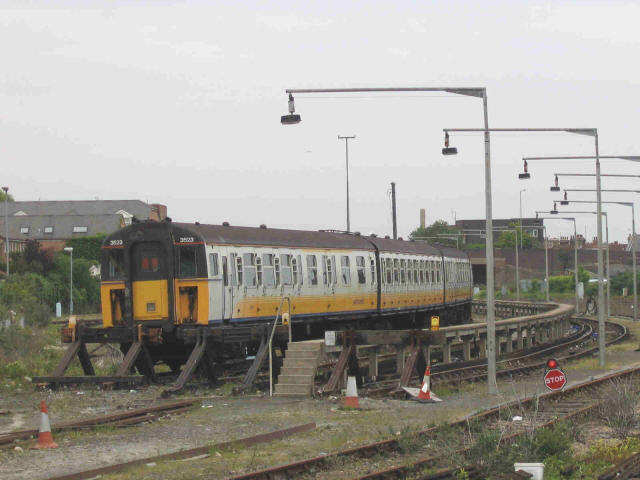
Eastbourne carriage sidings, May 2005. Site of the first engine shed

The LB&SCR opened a small engine shed in 1849, but it was demolished in 1876, being replaced by a roundhouse in the same year, which was also demolished in 1912. A large, seven-road (seven-track) shed was opened in 1911, but this was badly damaged during the Second World War and was never repaired. Although the shed was closed in 1952, the site was still used as a storage area for locomotives awaiting scrapping until 1965. From 1965 to 1968, diesel locomotives were stored there, before the structure was finally demolished in 1969. Currently, the first engine shed site is occupied by the carriage sidings, while the later shed site is a wasteland.

=== Signal box ===
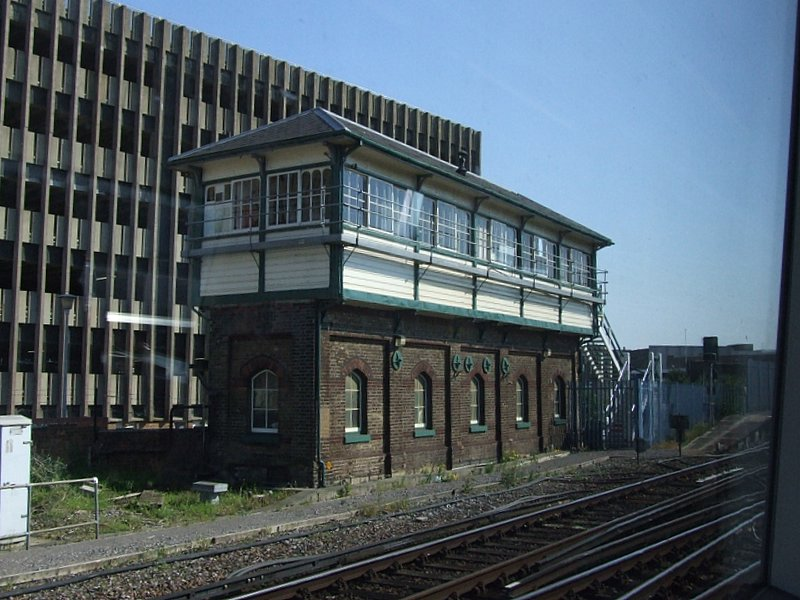
Eastbourne signal box

The current signal box was constructed in 1882 and had an impressive 108 lever frame that controlled the station, goods yard, and carriage sidings. On 14 November 1934, this was replaced with a 72 lever frame. Later in 1991, the box was converted into a power signal box when the semaphore signals were substituted with colour light signals and an "entrance-exit" control system was installed. The box closed in 2015 as the line between Lewes and Bexhill was re-signaled and controlled from a new signalling centre at Three Bridges.

=== Listed status ===
Eastbourne station was listed at Grade II on 3 July 1981.

== Accidents ==
On 25 August 1958, a Glasgow to Eastbourne sleeper train collided with an Ore to London Bridge service killing 5, leaving 22 with serious injuries and 18 with minor.

== Operating company ==
Since 2001, all regular train services have been operated by Southern, formerly South Central, which replaced Connex after acquiring their remaining franchise in August of that year.

=== Former privatised operators ===
- Connex South Central
- Virgin CrossCountry

=== Former long-distance services ===
Until the late 1960s, long-distance through trains ran from Eastbourne via Brighton to:

- Birkenhead Woodside via Redhill, Reading, Oxford, Birmingham Snow Hill and Shrewsbury
- Sheffield Victoria via Rugby Central, Loughborough Central and Nottingham Victoria
- Walsall via Birmingham New Street and Coventry.

An overnight train also ran from Glasgow Central.

Long-distance services again ran between 1988 and 1996, branded InterCity Holidaymaker. Between 1996 and 1997, Virgin CrossCountry ran a Saturday-only service to Glasgow Central in the morning and Manchester Piccadilly in the afternoon.

=== Former local services ===
Until 14 June 1965, a local service from Eastbourne ran via the Cuckoo Line to Tunbridge Wells West and later to Tonbridge. Between 15 June 1965 and 9 September 1968 a shuttle service ran to Hailsham.

== Services ==
The typical off-peak service in trains per hour from the station is:

- 2tph to London Victoria via Gatwick Airport
- 2tph to Brighton via Lewes
- 3tph to Ore via Hastings, of which 1 continues to Ashford International

On Sunday the typical service is:

- 1tph to London Victoria via Gatwick Airport
- 1tph to Brighton via Lewes
- 2tph to Ore via Hastings, of which 1 continues to Ashford International

Preceding station	National Rail	Following station
Hampden Park or Polegate	Southern; East Coastway Line	Terminus or Train reverses

== Facilities ==
- Ticket office
- Automatic ticket barriers
- Car park (100+ spaces)
- Pick up & drop off zone
- Toilets
- Telephones
- Cash machines
- Shops & cafes, including: a Subway, a WHSmith, a barber's, a florist and a coffee shop
- Taxi rank
- Bus stop (Eastbourne's main bus terminus is a 2-minute walk from the station)
- Sheltered seating around the whole station
- Passenger lounge
- Bicycle storage

== Future plans ==
Since 2014, there have been calls for reinstatement of the Willingdon Chord, some 3 miles (5 km) north of the station. This would allow trains on the East Coastway line to bypass Eastbourne, saving time on journeys to Hastings and Ashford International. However, this option has never been progressed into development, in part due to the potential for this to reduce train services serving Eastbourne, which has been criticised by local officials including former Eastbourne MP Caroline Ansell.

The halt was situated between Polegate and Hastings. The station closed on 7 July 1935. There was a petition raised by the Liberal Democrats to reopen the station as Langney station, but the campaign was called off.

However, these plans look to have been revived and Eastbourne council leader David Tutt said, “One issue that I am pressing for as part of this work is the inclusion of a new station at Stone Cross.”

== See also ==
- Listed buildings in Eastbourne
