= Hailsham railway station =

Former railway station in England

Coordinates: 50°51′38″N 0°15′26″E

Hailsham
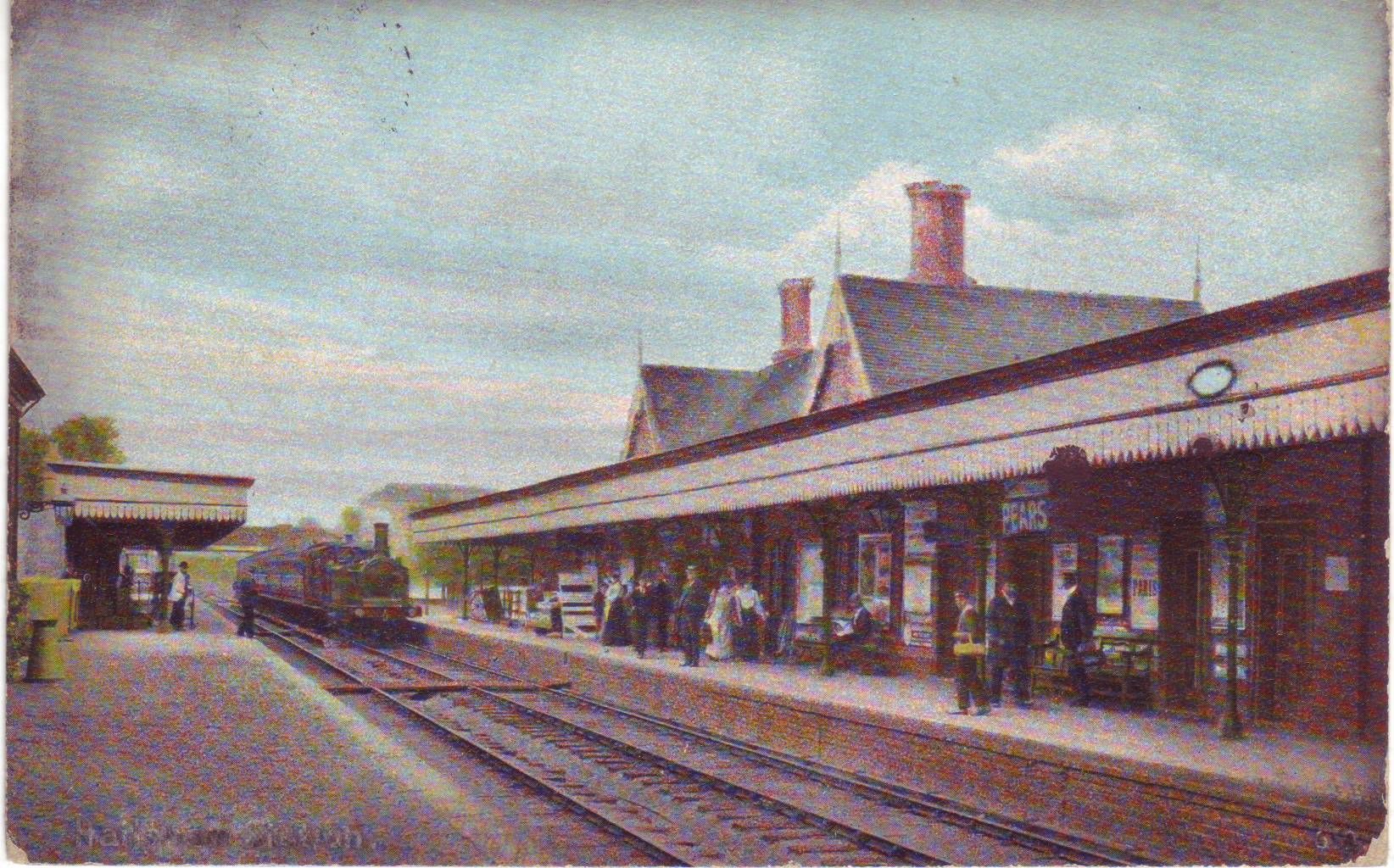

General information
- Location: Hailsham, Wealden; England
- Grid reference: TQ589093
- Platforms: 2

Other information
- Status: Disused

History
- Pre-grouping: London, Brighton and South Coast Railway
- Post-grouping: Southern Railway; Southern Region of British Railways

Key dates
- 14 May 1849: Station opened
- 1 September 1880: Station rebuilt
- 9 September 1968: Station closed to passengers
Location

Hailsham Railway Station was on the Cuckoo Line between Polegate and Hellingly serving the town of Hailsham. Originally built in 1849 by the London, Brighton and South Coast Railway, it was a terminus station serving both passengers and livestock for the nearby market. It remained a terminus until 1880 when it was connected with Eridge on a single line railway.

== Decline and closure ==
On 14 June, 1965, the station became a terminus again when the line northward closed to passenger traffic. Freight continued northwards as far as Heathfield until 26 April 1968 when a lorry damaged a bridge at Horsebridge, north of Hailsham. It had already been earmarked for closure on 7 May, and as such it was not deemed economic to repair the bridge so line was subsequently never reopened to Heathfield. On 8 September 1968, the last passenger train left Hailsham at 10:30pm and the station and line then closed completely.

== Present day ==
The station site was mostly cleared for a housing estate in the 1980s. A concrete wall remains on the west side of the site, which held the embankment up. Part of the site is now a public car park. A bridge north of the station site also survives, although heavily modified, and carries a road over the former trackbed which has now become the Cuckoo Trail public footpath. Polegate is the nearest station to Hailsham, some 4 miles distant on the Eastbourne to London line.

== Line details ==
Preceding station	Disused railways	Following station
Hellingly	British Rail; Southern Region; Cuckoo Line	Polegate
