= Hellingly Hospital Railway =

Light railway owned and operated by East Sussex County Council

Coordinates: 50°53′16″N 0°15′37″E

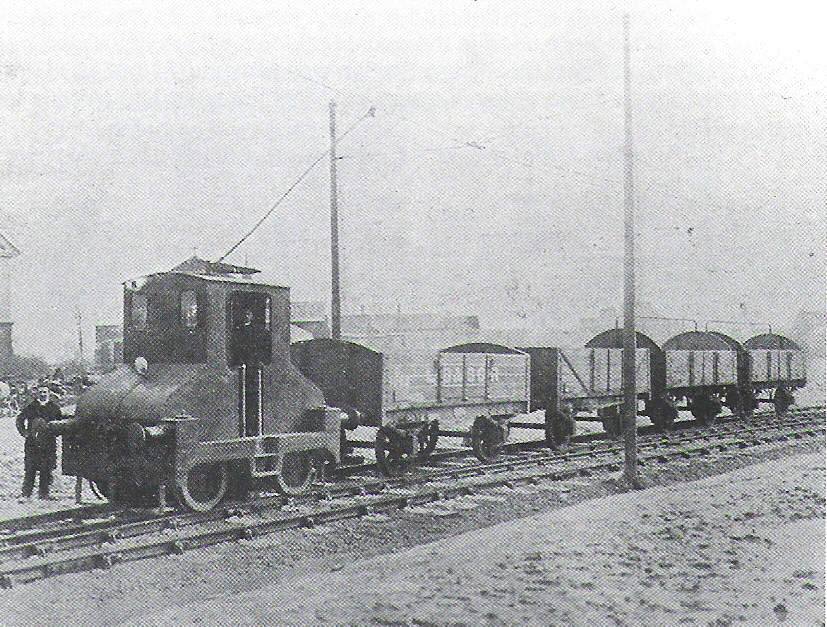
Electric locomotive and goods wagons on the Hellingly Hospital Railway in 1906. At the time of the line's closure in 1959 this was the oldest operational electric locomotive in the British Isles.

The Hellingly Hospital Railway was a British light railway owned and operated by East Sussex County Council, used for transporting coal and passengers to Hellingly Hospital, a psychiatric hospital near Hailsham, from the London, Brighton and South Coast Railway's Cuckoo Line at Hellingly railway station.

The railway was constructed in 1899 and opened to passengers on 20 July 1903, following its electrification in 1902. After the railway grouping of 1923, passenger numbers declined so significantly that the hospital authorities no longer considered passenger usage of the line to be economical, and that service was withdrawn in 1931. The railway closed to freight in 1959, following the hospital's decision to convert its coal boilers to oil, which rendered the railway unnecessary.

The route took a mostly direct path from a junction immediately south of Hellingly Station, past Farm and Park House Sidings, stopping places to load and unload produce and supplies from outbuildings of the hospital. Much of the railway has been converted to footpath, and many of the buildings formerly served by the line are now abandoned.

== Construction and opening ==
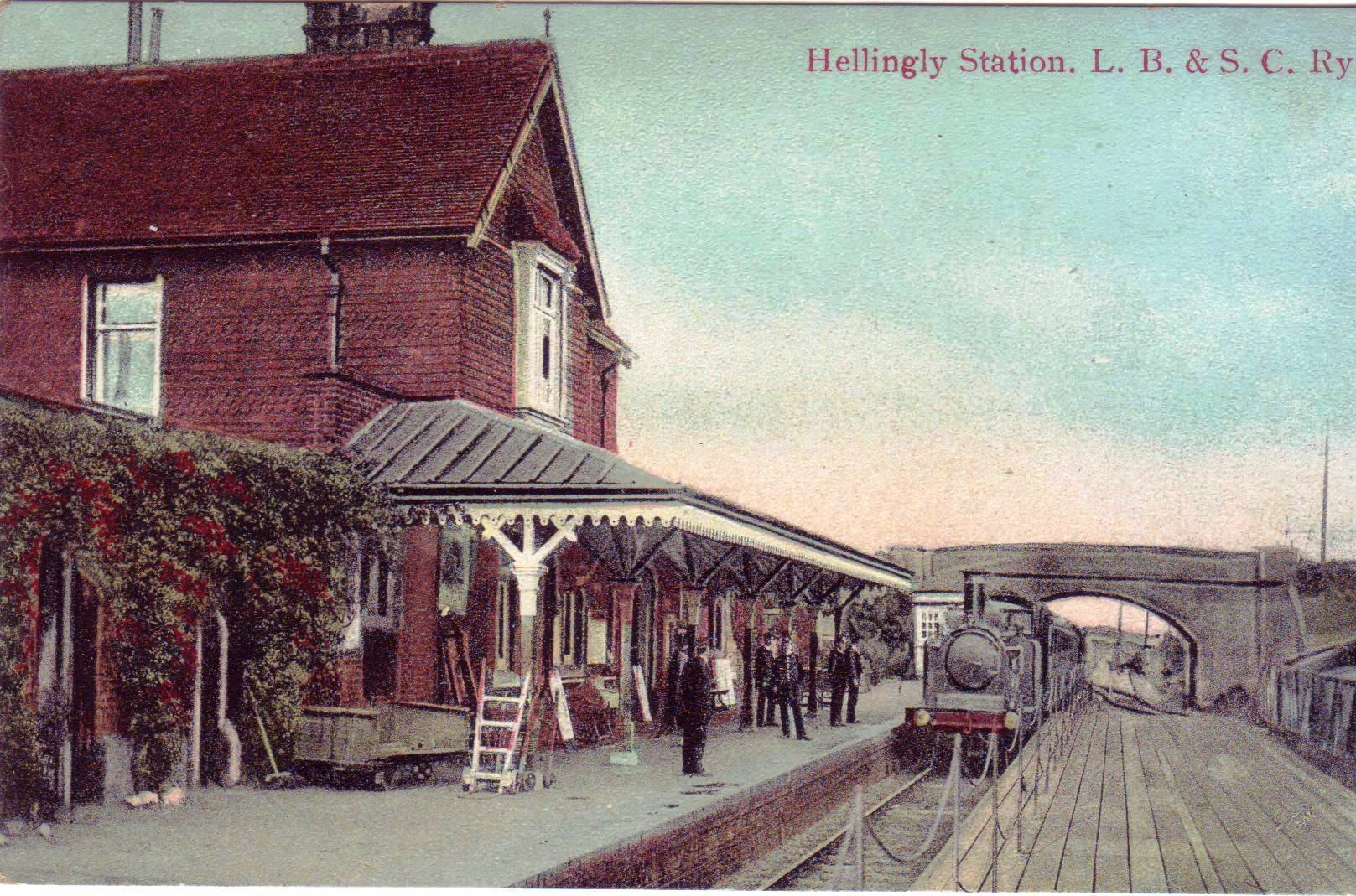
Hellingly Station in the early 20th century, showing the wooden platform before it was shortened

In 1897, East Sussex County Council purchased 400 acres (160 ha) of land at Park Farm, about 3 mi (4.8 km) north of Hailsham, from the Earl of Chichester, to be the site of a new county lunatic asylum that became Hellingly Hospital. (Note: Reflecting changing attitudes to, and terminology within, the field of psychiatric medicine, the hospital went through multiple renamings in its lifetime. Known as the County Lunatic Asylum prior to opening, it was opened in 1903 as the East Sussex County Asylum. On 28 June 1919 it was renamed the East Sussex Mental Hospital. Following the nationalisation of the health service in 1948, the formal name gradually declined in usage, and by the time of the closure of the main hospital building in 1990 it was always referred to as Hellingly Hospital. The name "Hellingly Hospital" was used informally (and in semi-official material such as staff publications) throughout the existence of the hospital, and the railway line was known as the "Hellingly Hospital Railway" from the outset.) Construction work on the hospital began in 1900, to the design of George Thomas Hine, who had designed the nearby Haywards Heath Asylum. Building materials were transported to the site by a 1 1/4 mi (2.0 km) standard gauge private siding from the goods yard at Hellingly railway station on the Cuckoo Line. The connection was built by the asylum's builders, Joseph Howe & Company, and was authorised by the London, Brighton and South Coast Railway (LBSCR) on condition that East Sussex Council paid the cost, estimated at £1,700.

A small wooden platform was built at Hellingly railway station, opposite the main line platform. This had no connection to the station buildings and was used only for the transfer of passengers between main-line and hospital trains, and kept chained off when not in use. Coal yards and sidings were also built at Hellingly station. The hospital opened to patients, and the railway to passengers, on 20 July 1903.

== Route ==
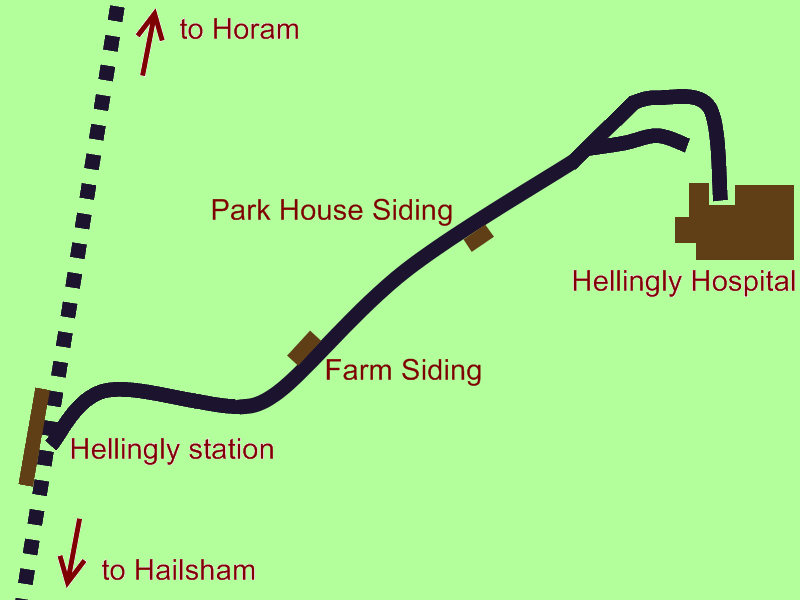
Route of the Hellingly Hospital Railway

The railway left the Cuckoo Line at Hellingly Station. Although the railway joined the Cuckoo Line at both the northern and southern ends of the platform, virtually no through trains ran. Due to the arrangement of the lines at the junction with the Cuckoo Line, passenger trains to and from the hospital reversed south of Hellingly station.

After leaving the main line immediately south of Hellingly, the railway passed over gated level crossings at Park Road and New Road. Farm Siding, a single siding on the west of the line beyond the crossings, was a collection point for the farm's agricultural produce in the early years of the railway, but later fell out of use. The line climbed most of the way from here to the hospital at 1 in 50. About halfway between Hellingly and the hospital the line entered the hospital grounds, passing to the west of Park House Siding, which served the hospital's Park House annexe.

As it approached the hospital, the line split; the southern fork led to a siding to the north-west of the hospital, while the other turned sharply east and south through almost 180° before splitting again. One fork ran into a large workshop and the other led to a short platform, which was initially used for passengers. Following the suspension of passenger services it was converted into a coal dock.

The line had no signals or automatic points to control the switching between lines at junctions with the main line and with the sidings. On the approach to a level crossing the fireman ran ahead with a red flag, to stop the traffic; he also manually operated the points.

== Motive power ==
Joseph Howe & Company used an 0-4-0 saddle tank locomotive to transport building materials during the hospital's construction. The locomotive was purchased new in 1900, and sold in 1903 following the completion of the hospital and electrification of the line.

In 1902, the decision was taken to electrify the railway using power generated from the hospital's own power plant, the line was electrified at 500 V DC using a single overhead line. The power plant (to generate the electricity for the hospital and railway) was the creation of Messrs Spagnoletti & Co (of London). James E. Spagnoletti was the son of Charles Spagnoletti who was a consulting electrical engineer to both electric railways and the London Electric Omnibus Company. James was first employed on the railways, but created his own company building electricity generation plant. Messrs Spagnoletti had, therefore, the combination of experience to integrate power generation for the electric railway with the domestic generating capacity for the mental hospital.

The hospital was also connected to the local 11 kV electricity distribution system.

Engineers Robert W. Blackwell & Co provided a small 0-4-0 electric locomotive capable of pulling two loaded coal wagons. It is not known where the locomotive was manufactured, as the company has no record, but the design of the controls suggests that it may have been imported from Germany. A small railcar/tramcar made by Brush Engineering Company with space for 12 passengers was also provided. The locomotive and the railcar were each fitted with a single trolley pole to collect electricity from the overhead wire. The passenger car was used for the duration of passenger services on the line, and the locomotive from the electrification of the line until closure in 1959. At that time, it was the oldest operational electric locomotive in the British Isles.

== Operations ==
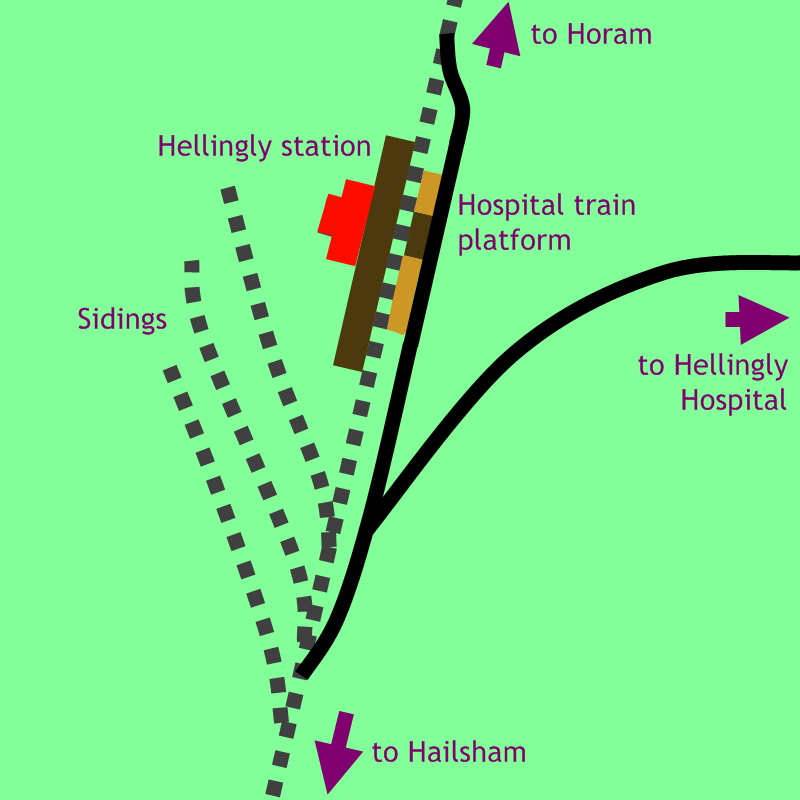
Layout of LBSCR (dotted) and HHR (solid) lines and platforms at Hellingly station

At the railway grouping of 1923, the LBSCR became part of the Southern Railway and the agreements between the hospital (renamed the East Sussex Mental Hospital in 1919) and the LBSCR were updated. The wooden platform at Hellingly station was drastically shortened in 1922. Because service levels depended on patient numbers and the hospital's coal and food requirements, the line never operated to a timetable. By 1931, passenger numbers had fallen to such an extent that the hospital authorities no longer considered passenger usage of the line to be economical, and the passenger service was withdrawn. The passenger car was moved to the hospital grounds, fitted with an awning, and became the hospital's sports pavilion. surviving into the mid-1990s before being destroyed in a fire started by vandals. The wooden platform at Hellingly station was removed in 1932, and the platform at the hospital was converted into a coal bay.

There were only two minor accidents: a car that collided with the locomotive whilst driving through the hospital grounds, and a wagon whose brakes failed whilst stabled at Farm Siding, which rolled down the line to Hellingly station.

On 22 November 1939, plans were put in place for the restoration of passenger services to allow ambulance trains to reach the hospital, and authorisation was given for their operation. However, the line was never used to transport patients, as although Park House was used as a hospital by the Canadian Army during the Second World War, patients left ambulance trains at Hellingly station and were transferred to Park House by road.

== Closure ==
In the late 1950s, the hospital, under the control of the Hailsham Hospitals Management Committee since the 1948 establishment of the National Health Service, decided to convert its boilers from coal to oil. The railway was therefore no longer needed to transport coal; the last load was delivered on 10 March 1959, and the empty coal wagon returned to Hellingly on 25 March 1959.

Under the terms of the agreement between the hospital authorities, the LBSCR, and its successors, the hospital authorities were obliged to keep the railway in good repair to allow its use by main-line wagons. With a greatly reduced need for goods traffic to the hospital following the conversion of the boilers, it was decided that the railway was not worth the expense of continued maintenance and necessary upgrading, and the line was officially closed on 25 March 1959 following the departure of the last coal wagon.

The line was used for occasional excursions by railway enthusiasts for a short period after official closure, using the electric locomotive and a brake van borrowed from British Railways. The exact date of the last run is not recorded; the last recorded use of the line was an excursion organised by the Norbury Transport and Model Railway Club on 4 April 1959, but it is known that later excursions ran. In the early 1960s a railway society in Yorkshire proposed to buy the track as a preserved railway. However, as the psychiatric hospital was still open the request was not considered practical, and the track was lifted in the early 1960s. The fittings and locomotive were disposed of by H.Ripley and Sons of Hailsham.

== Present day ==
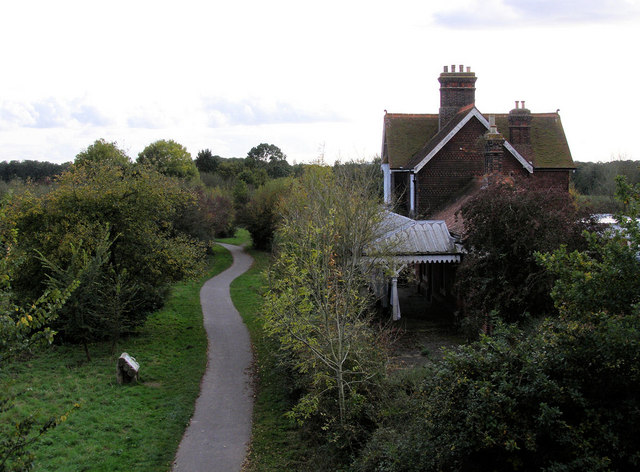
Hellingly station, 2008

The Cuckoo Line closed shortly after the Hospital Railway. Hellingly station closed to passengers on 14 June 1965, and the line closed for goods traffic on 26 April 1968. The station building complete with platform is now a private residence, and the Cuckoo Line trackbed was converted to the Cuckoo Trail long-distance footpath in 1990. Much of the route of the Hospital Railway is also now a footpath.

Traces of the railway can still be seen, including a cast iron pole that supported the overhead wire, the remains of the engine shed (burnt down in 2004), and a short section of track. Hellingly Hospital is now closed. Approval for redevelopment as a housing complex was obtained in 2009.

== See also ==
- High Royds Hospital, a psychiatric hospital in West Yorkshire that had railway spur from the Wharfedale Line.
- Park Prewett Hospital, a psychiatric hospital in Hampshire that had a spur line from Basingstoke.
- Whittingham Hospital Railway, a branch line that served the Whittingham psychiatric hospital in Lancashire.
- Horton Light Railway, a freight only railway serving the cluster of psychiatric hospitals near Epsom, Surrey.
