= Heathfield, East Sussex =

Town in East Sussex, England

Coordinates: 50.97°N 0.26°E

Heathfield
- Town
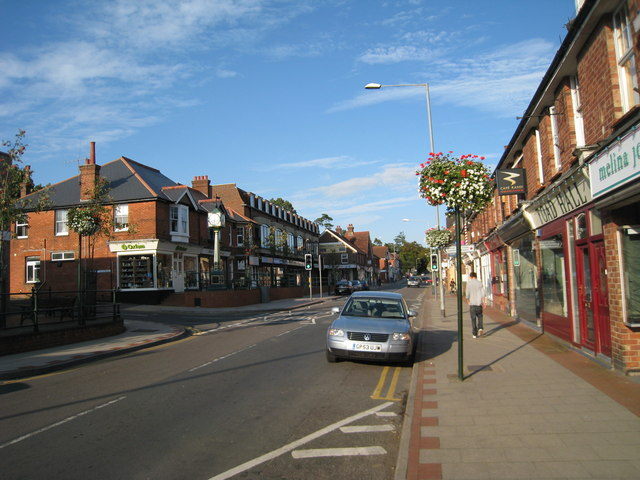
- Heathfield High Street

- Flag of Heathfield

- Location within East Sussex
- Area: 0.95 sq mi (2.5 km^{2})
- Population: 7,667 (2021)
  - Density: 8,071/sq mi (3,116/km^{2})
- OS grid reference: TQ586209
  - London: 40 miles (64 km) NNW
- Civil parish: Heathfield and Waldron
- District: Wealden
- Shire county: East Sussex
- Region: South East
- Country: England
- Sovereign state: United Kingdom
- Post town: HEATHFIELD
- Postcode district: TN21
- Dialling code: 01435
- Police: Sussex
- Fire: East Sussex
- Ambulance: South East Coast
- UK Parliament: Sussex Weald
- Website: http://www.heathfield.net/

Heathfield is a market town and former civil parish, now in the parish of Heathfield and Waldron, in the Wealden District of East Sussex, England. The town had a population of 7,667 in 2021. Locals know it by "Heffle".

== Location ==
Heathfield lies near the junction of two main roads: the A267 between Royal Tunbridge Wells and Eastbourne; and the A265 from Hawkhurst. It is almost equidistant from Tunbridge Wells and Eastbourne: approximately 16 mi (26 km).

== History ==
Historically, Heathfield lay on an ancient trackway connecting the South Downs with the Weald.

The Manor of Heathfield lies in the parish of the same name. The earliest known record for the manor is a market grant given to Ralph, Bishop of Chichester by Henry III in 1234. The rights to a fair were granted in February 1316 during the reign of Edward II to John, Bishop of Chichester. In 1559, the Government of Elizabeth I passed the Act of Exchange, seizing the possessions of the Bishops of Chichester in return for other payments. Heathfield was one of 73 manors taken by the Crown, which was subsequently granted to Thomas Sackville, the Earl of Dorset. The Manor remained in possession of the Sackville family until the death of the last Duke of Dorset, when it was acquired by the family of the Lords De La Warr through Elizabeth Sackville, Countess of De La Warr, whom married George Sackville-West, the 5th Earl De La Warr. The Manor left the possession of the De La Warr estate in the 1980s. The current Lord of Heathfield is Christopher Repetsky, a physician.

The Wealden iron brought prosperity to the town during the 16th and the 17th centuries. The coming of the railway (the Cuckoo Line) in 1880 gave it another new lease of life. The latter was not a financial success, and the branch line between Eridge and Polegate closed in 1968. The trackbed is now named the Cuckoo Trail, part of the National Cycle Network.

The original village, Old Heathfield, is now only part of the town, which has expanded over time.

In 1961 the parish had a population of 3244. On 1 April 1990 the parish was abolished and merged with Waldron to form "Heathfield and Waldron".

== Crime ==
The crime rates in Heathfield were lower than the national average:

Crime rates in Heathfield (per 1000 population) 2005-2006
Offence	Locally	Nationally
Robbery	0.25	1.85
Theft of a motor vehicle	1.87	4.04
Theft from a motor vehicle	5.35	9.59
Sexual offences	0.52	1.17
Violence against a person	10.14	19.97
Burglary	2.82	5.67

== Landmarks ==
The parish church in Heathfield is dedicated to All Saints: an example of a Harmer terracotta decorated gravestone is in the churchyard. The town is the home of Heathfield Park Cricket Club, formed in 1878, and enjoying one of the most scenic positions of any cricket ground in Sussex.

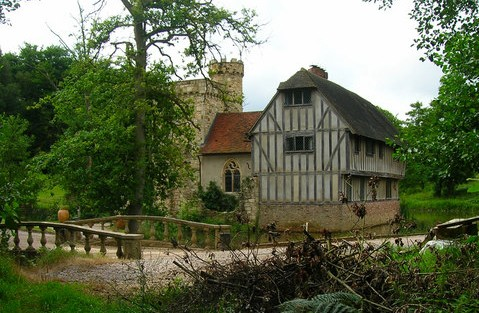
Braylsham Castle

The nearby mansion of Heathfield Park dates from the seventeenth century. In a corner of the estate stands a memorial named the Gibraltar Tower. To the north-east, on the edge of the parish, Braylsham Castle is a modern house begun in 1993 using traditional materials and building techniques, built in imitation of a moated medieval manor house, complete with working drawbridge.

Approximately one mile from the town is the Heathfield transmitting station, a 145 m high mast (135 m to the bottom of the antenna shroud) which broadcasts TV and radio signals to East and West Sussex, as well as parts of south Kent.

== Culture ==
The town holds an annual fair named the Heffle Cuckoo Fair each April, this has not been held since 2019 and the annual Heathfield Agricultural Show takes place each summer. Heathfield is the home of Heathfield Community College, several primary schools in the area and 2 pre-Schools. Opposite the college is a leisure centre, the leisure centre is owned by the school and runs very limited public classes, it does not have open access. There is an Anglo/French market called Le Marché held every year on the August Bank Holiday. There is a fairly large football field, and beside it a playground. At Cross-in-Hand, there is a rugby club for adults and children.

=== Heathfield Detachment - Sussex Army Cadet Force ===
Heathfield has an army cadet force detachment that is part of the Sussex Army Cadet Force group. This detachment is based in the Youth Centre on High Street, and is affiliated to Princess of Wales' Royal Regiment. The Detachment meets on Monday and Wednesday evenings from 19:00 to 21:30 each week.

=== Heathfield Silver Band ===
The Heathfield Silver Band is a silver band headquartered in Heathfield with a history dating back as far as 1880. The band has a large membership, with members spanning the ages of 9 to 80. Although women were not allowed to participate in years past, the band now accepts members regardless of gender.

The rehearsal site on Alexandra Road in Heathfield was extended and refurbished following a steady increase in band membership. TV presenter David Dimbleby officially opened the newly extended band room on 3 September 2005.

The Heathfield Silver Band plays at weddings, garden parties, church functions, and fetes and regularly gives concerts. They are also a marching band, taking part in the local bonfire celebrations. During September–November they march in Uckfield, Crowborough, Mayfield, Lewes, and East Hoathly carnivals, as well as for their hometown Heathfield & District Bonfire Society. They also march on Remembrance Sunday, St. George's Day, and at Heathfield's Heffle Cuckoo Fair.

=== Heathfield & District Bonfire Society ===
Reformed in 2018 by a group of local enthusiasts (Founders Steve Thomas, Dave Shoebridge, Thomas Keep, Rachel Keep, Ken Brewster and Halina Keep), HDBS aims to enhance the sense of community in their town and surrounding area by holding the traditional celebration of bonfire and torchlight procession and joining in the annual season of events around Sussex representing Heathfield & District at other societies bonfire events. HDBS is a non-profit organisation so any surplus money goes back into the community to help local charities and groups. 2019 was the first official HDBS Bonfire Night in 62 years to the day, bringing bonfire back to Heathfield. HDBS hopes to put on more bonfire nights for the community and are looking forward to building on and creating more connections with local organisations, businesses & schools in Heathfield.

== Media ==
Local news and television programmes are provided by BBC South East and ITV Meridian. Television signals are received from the nearby Heathfield TV transmitter.

Local radio stations are BBC Radio Sussex on 104.5 FM, Heart South on 102.4 FM and Ashdown Radio, a community based radio station which broadcast from its studio in Uckfield on 105 FM.

The town's local newspaper is The Heathfield News, which publishes online.

== Notable people ==
Famous residents include Olympic gold medallist Jayne Torvill, England rugby international Joe Marler, former Doctor Who actor Tom Baker, guitarist Fred Frith, musician and singer-songwriter Mark Hollis, national badminton player Heather Olver, and singer-songwriter Rag'n'Bone Man.

== See also ==
- List of current places of worship in Wealden
