= Smokescreen (film) =

1964 British film by Jim O'Connolly

- Lobby card autographed by Deryck Guyler
- Directed by: Jim O'Connolly
- Written by: Jim O'Connolly
- Produced by: Ronald Liles; John I. Phillips
- Starring: Peter Vaughan; John Carson; Yvonne Romain; Gerald Flood
- Cinematography: Jack Mills
- Edited by: Henry Richardson
- Music by: Johnny Gregory
- Production company: Butcher's Film Productions
- Distributed by: Butcher's Film Service
- Release date: 1964
- Running time: 70 minutes
- Country: United Kingdom
- Language: English

Smokescreen is a 1964 British comedy crime drama film, written and directed by Jim O'Connolly and starring Peter Vaughan.

== Plot ==
Mr Roper, an insurance investigator, travels to Brighton to assess the apparent death of a businessman after his burning car was seen crashing over a cliff into the sea. The insurance company is suspicious, as the man had only recently taken out life insurance for a large sum. The car is recovered and no body is found. Roper and the police have to find out whether they are dealing with an accident, an insurance fraud or a murder.

== Cast ==
- Peter Vaughan as "Ropey" Roper
- John Carson as Trevor Bayliss
- Yvonne Romain as Janet Dexter
- Gerald Flood as Graham Turner
- Glynn Edwards as Inspector Wright
- John Glyn-Jones as Mr Player
- Sam Kydd as hotel waiter
- Deryck Guyler as station master (as Derek Guyler)
- Penny Morrell as Helen, Turner's secretary
- David Gregory as photographer
- Jill Curzon as June
- Barbara Hicks as Miss Breen
- Bert Palmer as barman
- Tom Gill as receptionist
- Edward Ogden as police sergeant
- Anthony Dawes as John Dexter
- Romo Gorrara as taxi driver
- Maja Hafernik as Mrs Dexter's maid
- Derek Francis as Dexter's doctor (uncredited)
- Damaris Hayman as Mrs Roper's nurse (uncredited)

== Production ==
The opening scenes were shot in London, but much of the rest of the film was shot on location in West Sussex and East Sussex, including the Brighton area. The scene featuring Deryck Guyler as the station master was shot at Hellingly railway station, which has been a private residence since the Cuckoo Line ceased operating in 1968.

== Critical reception ==
The Monthly Film Bulletin wrote: "Although familiar in style and idiom, this pleasant little mystery story has a few features that lift it out of the ordinary. The central figure – a bowler-hatted, umbrella-carrying, shrewd and gently humorous insurance man, with a streak of monetary meanness – is unconventional. So is the refreshingly off-hand police inspector played by Glynn Edwards. Above all, the general economy of the script makes this thriller much less improbable than many of its kind; there are no glaring loopholes or unexplained incidents. It is a pity that the Brighton insurance representative had to be in love with the murdered man's wife, for the plot is otherwise free of such convenient and contrived coincidences."

The Radio Times Guide to Films gave the film 3/5 stars, writing: "This above-average programme filler is kept moving swiftly and painlessly by director Jim O'Connolly. Adultery, embezzlement and murder are all taken in his stride by Peter Vaughn as the insurance claims inspector who suspects that there is more to a blazing car wreck than meets the eye. While all around him give typically second-division performances, Vaughan plays with a dogged determination that is efficient, engaging and quite at odds with the more sinister characters he would essay later in his career."

BFI Screenonline described the film as "an utterly charming B-film comedy-thriller that emphasises character as much as plot and makes full use of extensive location footage. The standard British second feature crime setting – a nightclub run by Cypriot/Maltese/Generally Swarthy types and populated by a dozen underpaid extras – is mercifully absent, as is any hint of a low-budget car chase. ... As a director, Jim O'Connelly may be best described as rudimentary, but his screenplay encompasses fascinating period detail. ... The set may be cheap and the shooting schedule limited, but the entertainment value is far greater than many an over-inflated epic."

Film historians Steve Chibnall and Brian McFarlane selected Smokescreen as one of the 15 most meritorious British B films made between the Second World War and 1970. They describe it as an "uncommonly neat little insurance racket-cum-murder thriller" and praise the way that its comic relief is "built into the fabric of the film's main narrative action".
