= Hellingly =

Village in East Sussex, England

Coordinates: 50.89°N 0.25°E

- Village, civil parish, and district ward
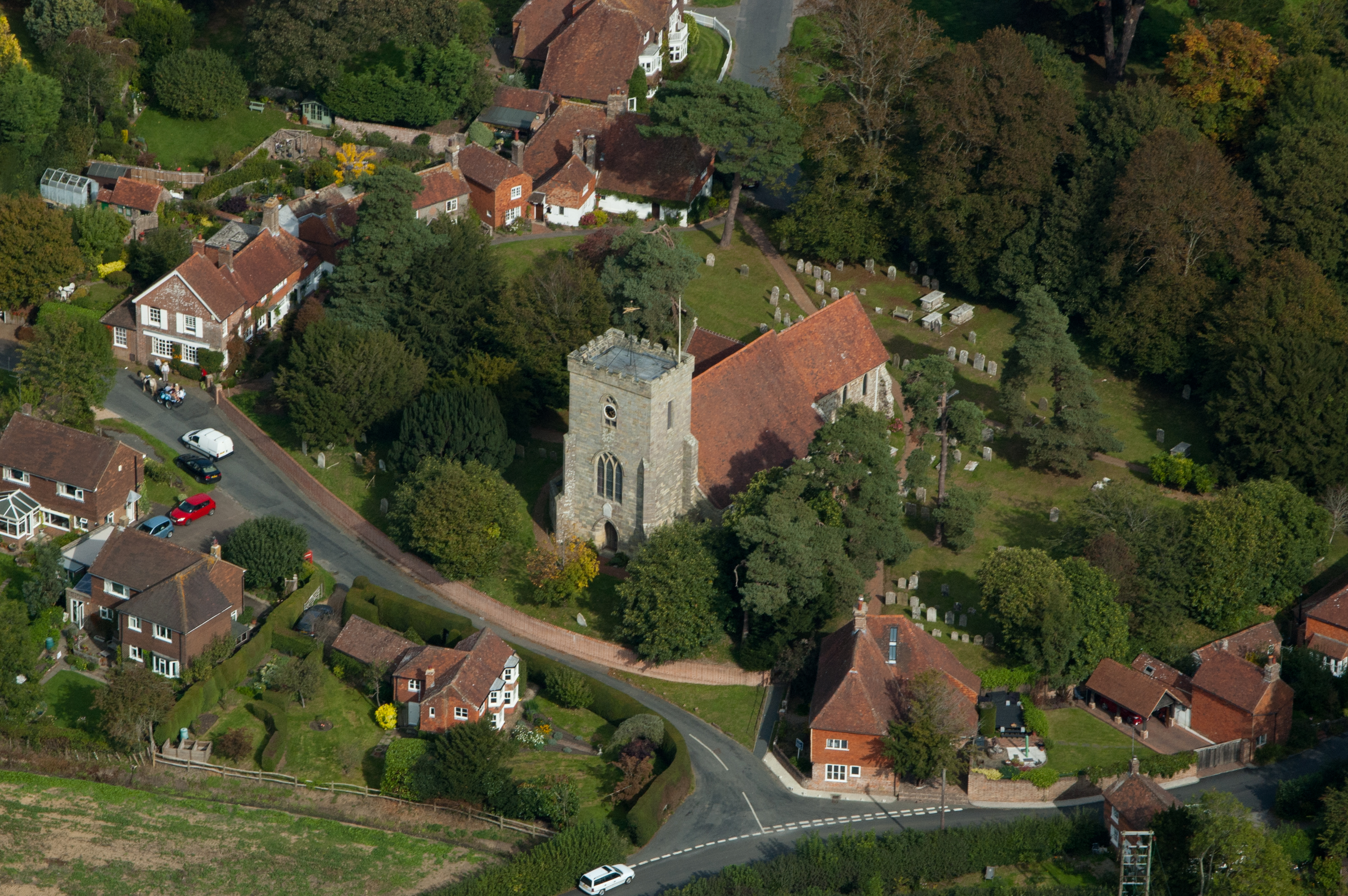
- Aerial view of Hellingly village centre

- Location within East Sussex
- Area: 19.6 km^{2} (7.6 sq mi)
- Population: 1,820 (2011)
  - Density: 205/sq mi (79/km^{2})
- OS grid reference: TQ581122
  - London: 45 miles (72 km) NNW
- District: Wealden
- Shire county: East Sussex
- Region: South East
- Country: England
- Sovereign state: United Kingdom
- Post town: HAILSHAM
- Postcode district: BN27
- Post town: HEATHFIELD
- Postcode district: TN21
- Dialling code: 01323; 01435
- Police: Sussex
- Fire: East Sussex
- Ambulance: South East Coast
- UK Parliament: Wealden
- Website: http://www.hellingly-pc.org.uk/

Hellingly (/ˈhɛlɪŋlaɪ/ HELL-ing-lye) is a village, and can also refer to a civil parish, and to a district ward, in the Wealden District of East Sussex, England.

== Geography ==
Hellingly contains the confluence of the River Cuckmere and one of its tributaries, the Bull River, close to the centre of the historic Hellingly village. The parish stands on the lower southern slopes of the gentle uplands forming the Weald.

The geographic centre of the parish is southeast of Old North Street and northwest of Church Lane, 2 miles (3.2 km) north of the town centre of Hailsham.

The village of Hellingly, the village of Lower Dicker, the village of Lower Horsebridge, the hamlet of Grove Hill, the suburbs of Roebuck Park and Carters Corner, are all entirely within the boundaries of the parish of Hellingly.

Liminal areas to the north of the village of Upper Dicker, to the east of the hamlet of Gun Hill, and to the south of the hamlet of North Corner, also fall within the boundaries of the parish of Hellingly.

== History ==
The villages and settlements in the parish, like many others on the Weald, were involved in the Wealden iron industry.

The mill building is a Grade II* listed building and the associated miller's house is Grade II. Horselunges Manor is a moated Tudor manor house, originally built for the Devenish family and restored by Walter Godfrey in the 1930s, and is Grade I listed.

== Hospitals ==
There are two NHS mental health sites within the parish of Hellingly, one is the Amberstone Hospital, a specialist rehabilitation unit to help people recover from long-term mental health issues, and the other site is the Hellingly Centre, a medium secure unit for people between the ages of 18 and 65 who have mental health problems and who have become involved with the criminal justice system. Both sites are managed by Sussex Partnership NHS Foundation Trust.

Hellingly Hospital once dominated the area east of the village and was the principal mental hospital for East Sussex. Opened in 1903 it remained in use until 1994. The buildings maintenance were under-invested before being sold by the NHS and demolished to be replaced by a housing estate, named by the developer as Roebuck Park.

== Sport ==
The main sports clubs in the village are Hellingly Rugby Club and Hellingly cricket club, which are both at Horsebridge recreation ground.

== Governance ==
Hellingly civil parish is administered at the lowest level of local government by Hellingly Parish Council.

Hellingly civil parish forms part of the larger Hellingly district ward, which also includes the village of Magham Down and the settlement of Ginger’s Green, in the Wealden District, with Wealden District Council being the middle level of local government for Hellingly.

Hellingly district ward forms part of the even larger Arlington, East Hoathly & Hellingly county electoral division for East Sussex, with East Sussex County Council being the highest level of local government for Hellingly.

The population of this ward at the 2011 census was 5,940.

Hellingly is in the Wealden parliamentary constituency, the MP since 2015 has been Nus Ghani, Conservative.

== Religion ==
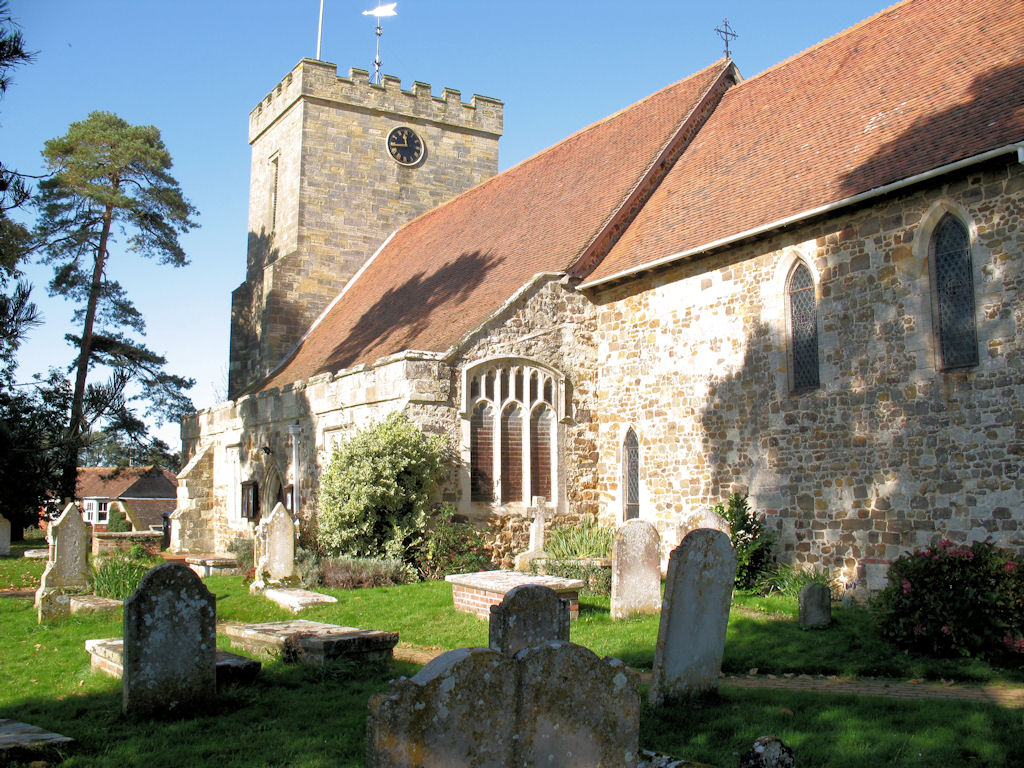
The tower of the parish church

The 13th-14th century parish church is dedicated to St Peter and St Paul. It is the only remaining example of a church built on a Saxon ciric, a circular mound, in the county. The chancel dates from about 1200, and the shafts with annulets round the windows and the band of palmettes under them are substantially original.

There is stained glass in the east lancet windows by Morris & Co. The church is Grade I listed. Zoar Strict Baptist Chapel was founded in 1837 at Lower Dicker.

== Transport ==
The Cuckoo Trail is a 14-mile (23 km) footpath and cycleway that passes through the parish.

This parish had a railway station on the Polegate to Eridge line which closed in 1968.

The parish is served by buses run by Stagecoach and by Seaford & District Buses

== Notable people ==
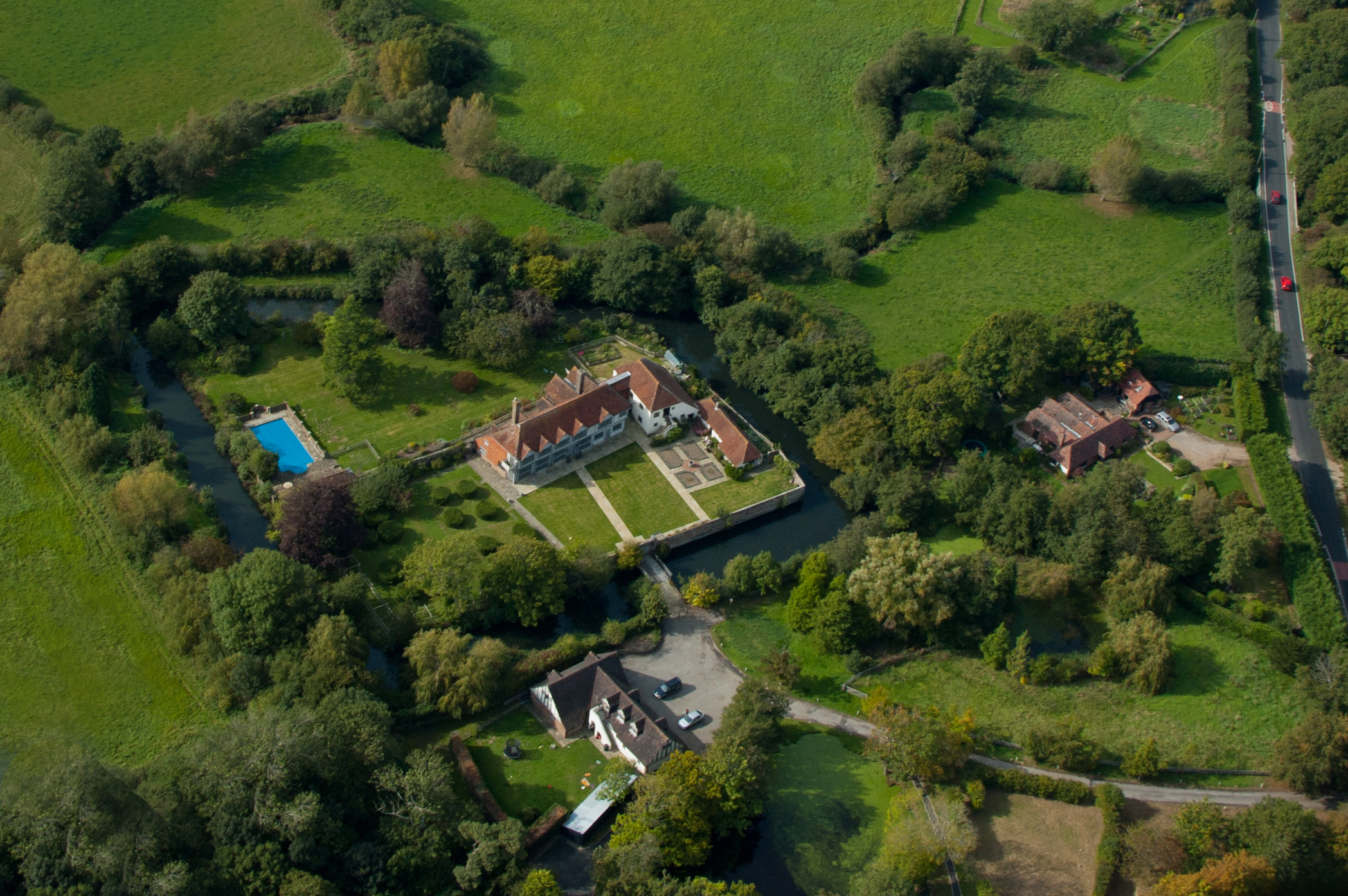
Horselunges Manor, Hellingly

- Margaret Fairchild (1911–1989) aka Miss Shepherd, the subject of the 2015 film The Lady in the Van, was born here
- Peter Grant (1935–1995), actor and music executive, lived in Hellingly, at Horselunges Manor, which was featured in the opening scene of the Led Zeppelin film, The Song Remains the Same, and is buried in the civil cemetery.
