= Hellingly Cricket Club =

Cricket Club based in Hellingly, East Sussex, England

Personnel
- Captain: Adam Devlin

Team information
- Established: 1758
- Home venue: Horsebridge Recreation Ground

Hellingly Cricket Club is a cricket club based in Hellingly, East Sussex, England. The club was formed in 1758, and 2008 marked the 250th anniversary.

== History ==
The club dates back to 1758 when a newspaper contained the following article - On 21 June 1758, the gentlemen of Hellingly joined the gentlemen of the nearby villages Chiddingly and Chalvington to a game of cricket against the gentlemen of Firle and Ringmer, to be played at The Broil in Ringmer. This match is still commemorated each year with an annual cricket game played in the form of the Chalvington Cup (which Hellingly currently hold in 2010). In a sponsored walk in March and April 2008, to celebrate the anniversary, members hit a cricket ball the 140 miles from Lords to their ground and back again. The club's old minute books show that the present cricket club was reformed on May 10, 1904, and that cricket was played at the turn of the century on the field that is now Horsebridge Recreation Ground. Several years later Hellingly moved cricket grounds around the village until in 1953 a new cricket pitch was laid and a pavilion was erected back at Horsebridge Recreation Ground.
1972 saw six local clubs get together to form the East Sussex Cricket League. Hellingly in 1975 were the tenth team to join the league. Today the league has grown and now has twelve divisions with over 110 teams playing in it. In 2007, Hellingly made the decision to join the Sussex Cricket League, and 2008 saw them join the new 'Division 3 East' of the league.

== Grounds and Facilities ==
The Club plays its home games at Horsebridge Recreation Ground and Ninfield. Ninfield is used for third and fourth eleven games, and Horsebridge is used for all other home matches.
Horsebridge Recreation ground has a bar and Clubhouse, four sight-screens, two permanent nets as well as a roller net. In 2006–07, Wealden District Council granted £3,400 towards major ground care equipment, including a small electronic scoreboard and a 'slip cradle' . Planned improvements for 2011 are for a temporary score box to be built at the ground, as well as improvements to the square.

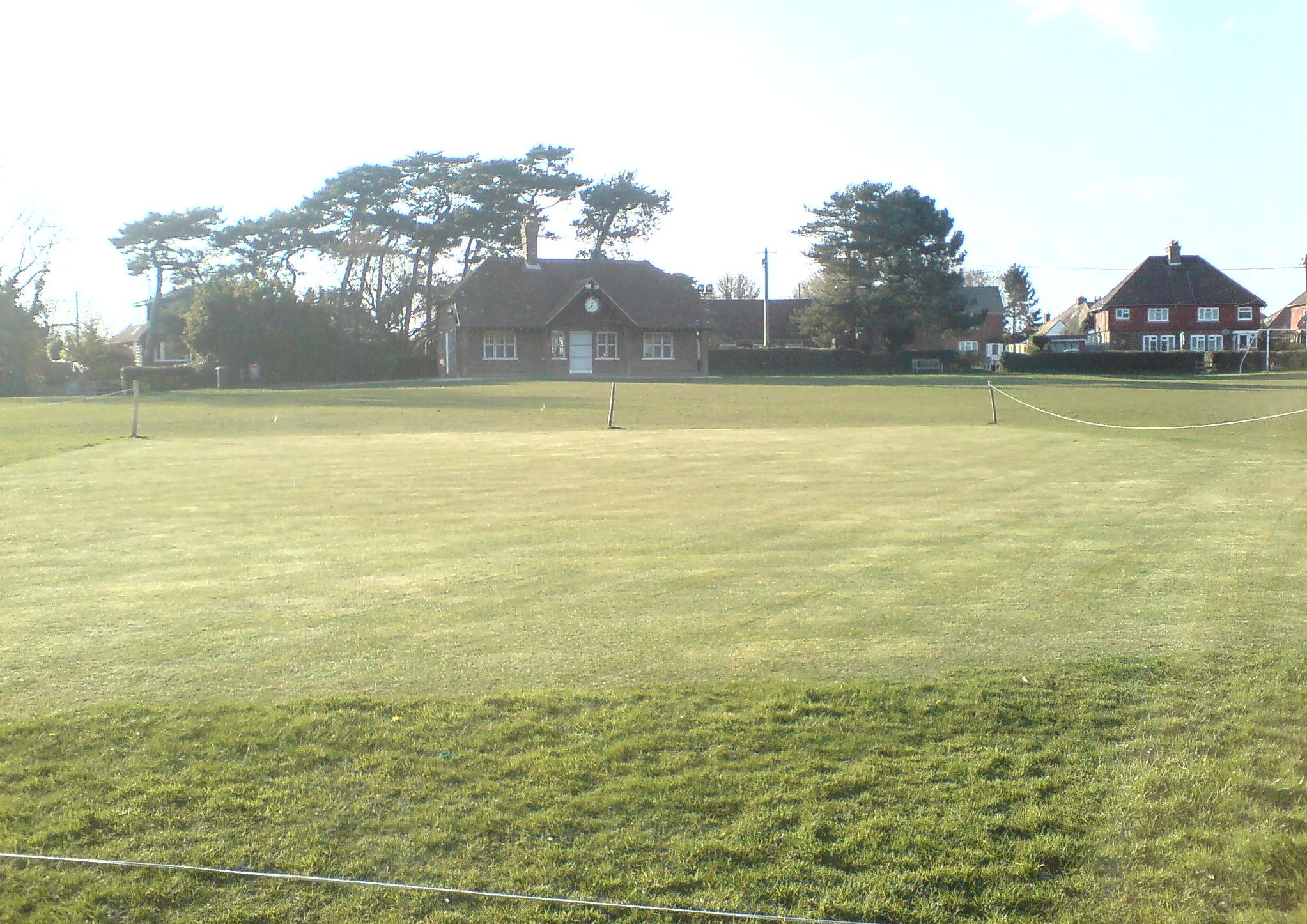
Ninfield Recreation Ground 2010

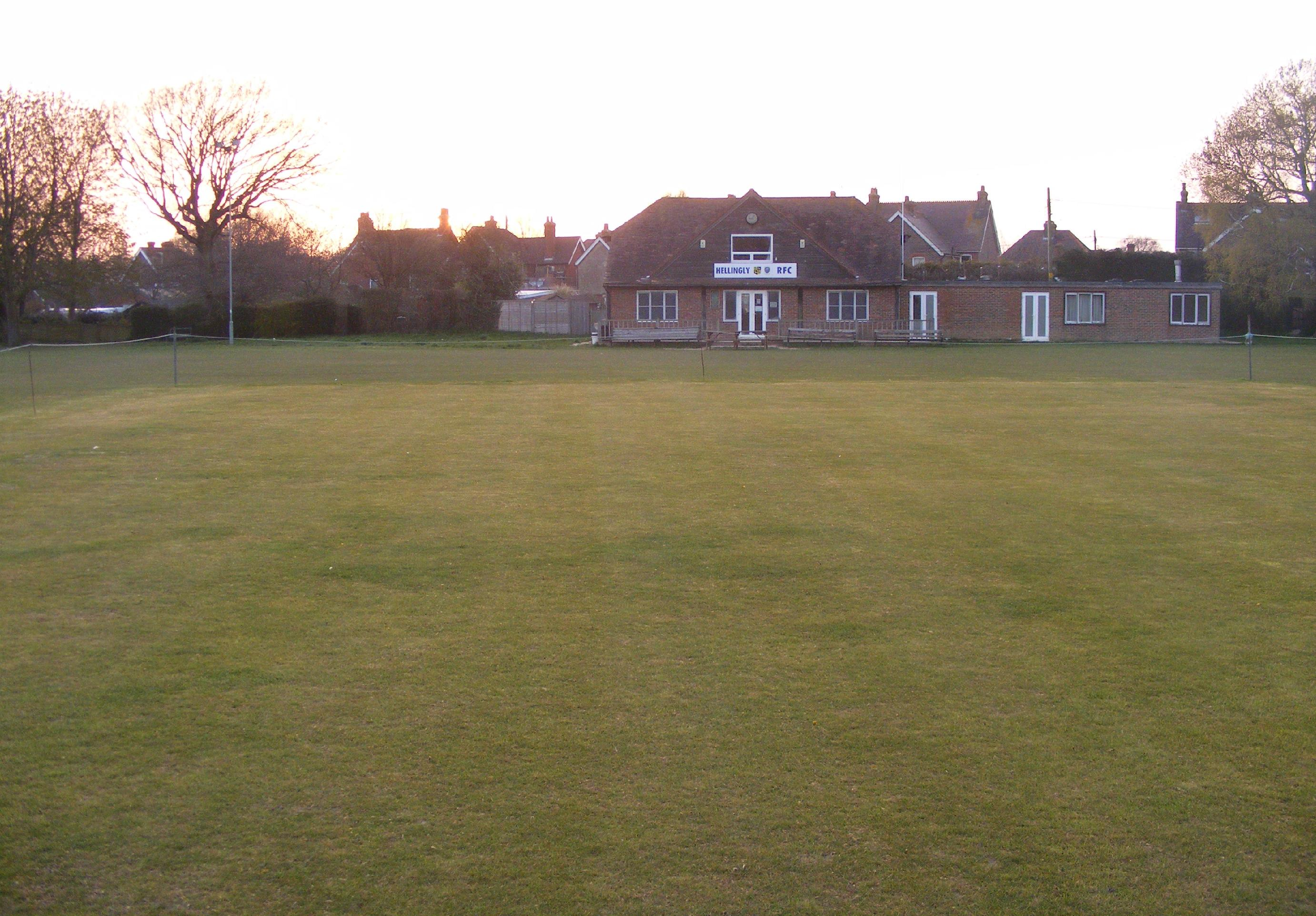
Horsebridge Recreation Ground 2010

== Competitions ==
The club has teams in various local leagues. The 1st and 2nd eleven teams play in the Sussex Cricket League in division 3, whilst the 3rd and 4th elevens play in division 9 and 11 of the East Sussex Cricket League. The club also has teams at under 8, 11, 12, 14, 16 and 18 age groups. 2010 saw a successful return of a Sunday side at Hellingly, playing friendly matches throughout the season. In January it was announced that the club has been accepted into the National Village Knock-out Cup for the 2011 season.

== Honours ==
The main cup that Hellingly enter each year is the Oakshott Knockout Cup, which the club has won on 13 occasions

Winners: 1948, 1949, 1953, 1955, 1957, 1966, 1969, 1986, 2002, 2003, 2006, 2009, 2010

== 2010 season ==
Out of the club's 252-year history, 2010 was the club's best year to date, which included the following silverware,

- Doug Standen Trophy
- Oakshott Cup
- Tony Horsecroft Memorial Trophy
- Chalvington Cup
- Division 10 Winners Trophy
- Division 12 Winners Trophy
- SCB U18 Development League Group Winners
- EACA Under 16's League Winners
- EACA Under 14's League Winners
- EACA Under 12's League Winners
- Eastbourne Under 13's Indoor League Cup
- East Sussex area fair play trophy
- SCL II's Division 3 league runners up

== The Ashrose media team ==
Although only playing in Division 3 of the Sussex League, you could be mistaken for thinking the club was playing in the County Championship, with every Saturday and Sunday first team fixture filmed from start to finish, using a range of cameras, camcorders and laptops. This allows the club to post videos, photos and detailed match reports from the games to websites and various local newspapers. 2010 saw the club post over 200 reports of every single game played in the season to four Newspapers, as well as the introduction of a monthly newsletter. The club has recently gained a permanent Internet connection and for the 2011 season they aim to allow members and followers of the club to get updates from the Hellingly website whilst the games are in progress.
