= Polegate railway station =

Railway station in East Sussex, England

Coordinates: 50°49′16″N 0°14′46″E

Polegate
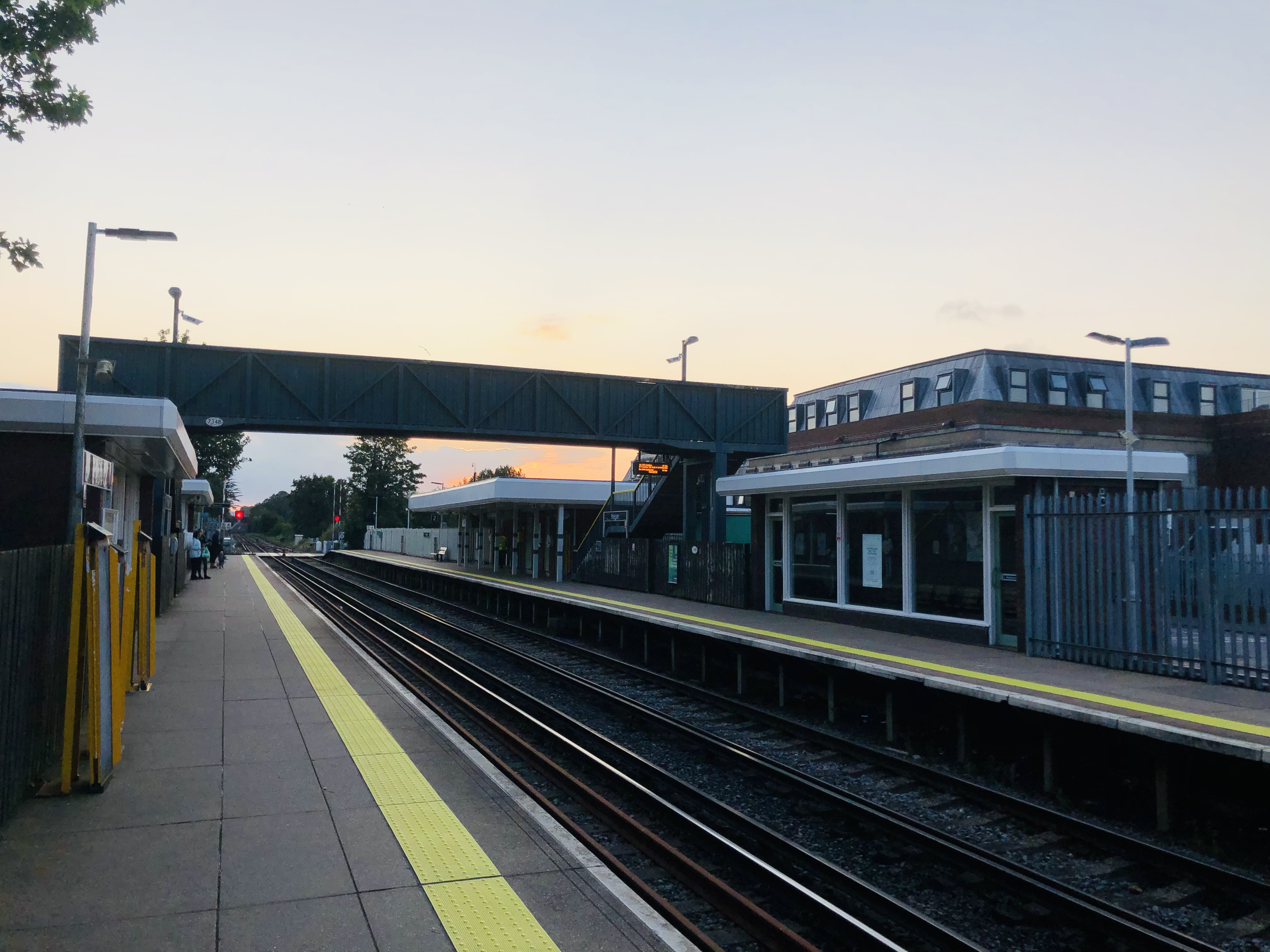

General information
- Location: Polegate, Wealden; England
- Grid reference: TQ582048
- Managed by: Southern
- Platforms: 2

Other information
- Station code: PLG
- Classification: DfT category D

Key dates
- 1846: Opened
- 1881: Resited 440yds east
- 1986: Resited on original site

Passengers
- 2020/21: ▼0.334 million
- Interchange: 299
- 2021/22: ▲0.785 million
- Interchange: ▲990
- 2022/23: ▲0.929 million
- Interchange: ▼19
- 2023/24: ▲0.979 million
- 2024/25: ▲1.080 million
Location
Notes
- Passenger statistics from the Office of Rail and Road

Polegate railway station serves Polegate in East Sussex, England. It is on the East Coastway Line, 61 miles 39 chains (99.0 km) from London Bridge, and train services are provided by Southern.

== History ==
=== First station ===
The first station opened on 27 June 1846 when the London and Brighton Railway opened the line from Lewes to Hastings. The station was built at Polegate to serve the nearby towns of Hailsham and South Bourne, the latter now part of Eastbourne. The first station was on the site of the present station. It then became a junction station on 14 May 1849 when an east facing branch headed northwards to Hailsham was opened and another southwards to Eastbourne, the station had enlarged to three through platforms and a bay platform for Hailsham services. The station then also had a one road engine shed and small freight yard complete with granary and weighing machine.

=== Second station ===
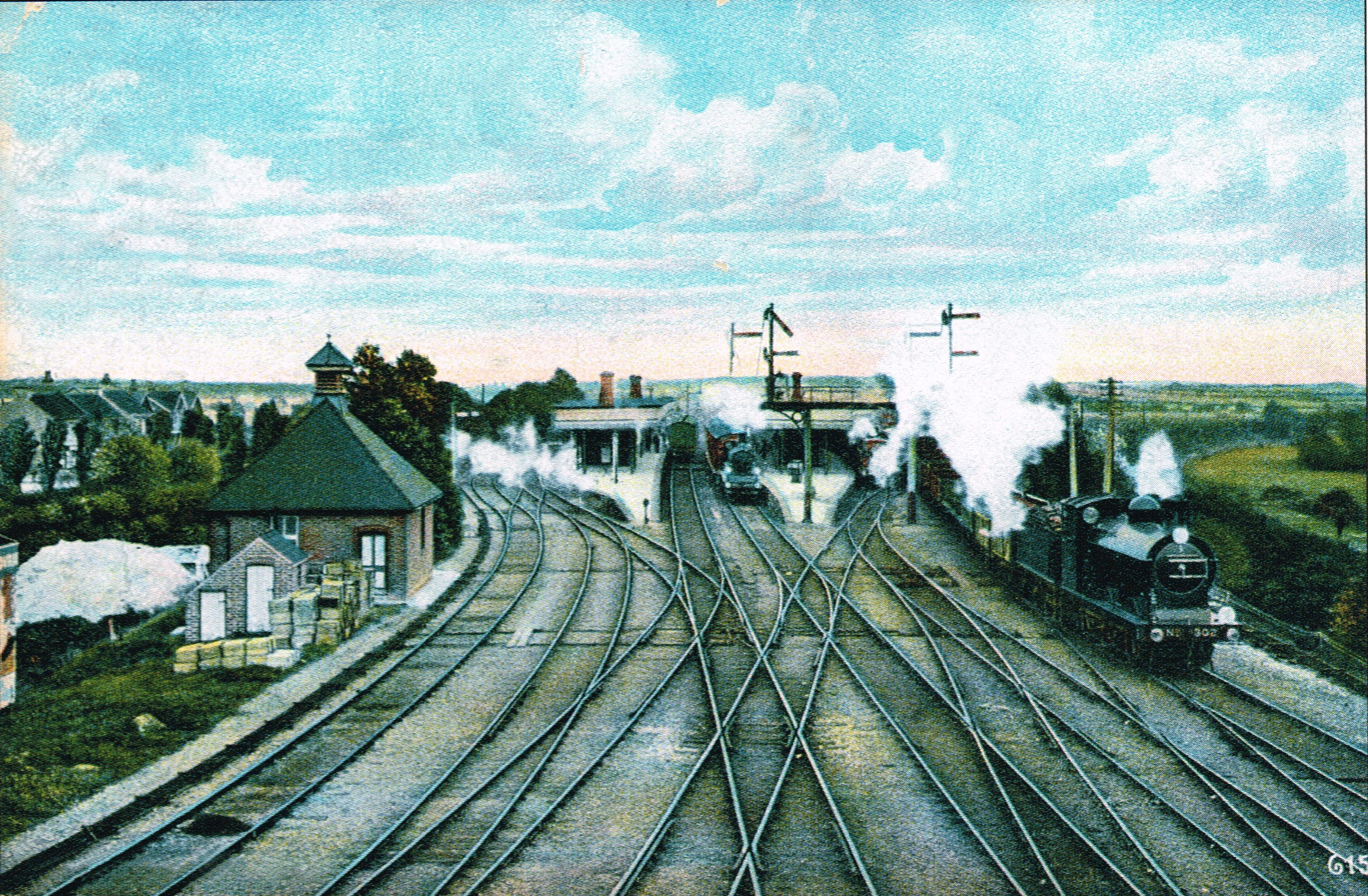
Polegate station in 1914

In 1881 the second station was opened in connection with the construction of a new westward facing line to Hailsham and the 1880 extension of the Cuckoo Line to Eridge, and the re-aligned branchline to Eastbourne which the present line follows today. The second station had four through platforms. The East Coastway line through Polegate was electrified in 1935 bringing in faster more frequent services. In 1965 the Cuckoo line north of Hailsham was closed followed in 1968 by complete closure of the branch to Hailsham. On 6 January 1969 the spur line to Pevensey (Stone Cross Junction) was closed and the up line was lifted, leaving the down line open for departmental trains until 1974 when the line became a mile long engineers siding with access only from Stone Cross Junction, this was then lifted in August 1984. and once extensive goods sidings were gradually closed and removed.

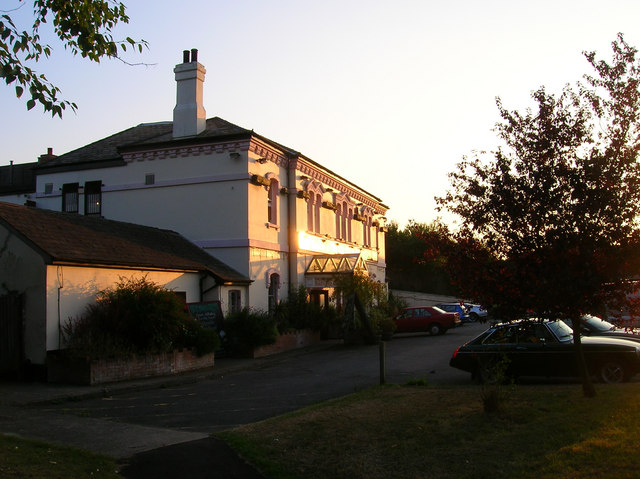
Second Polegate Station before it was demolished

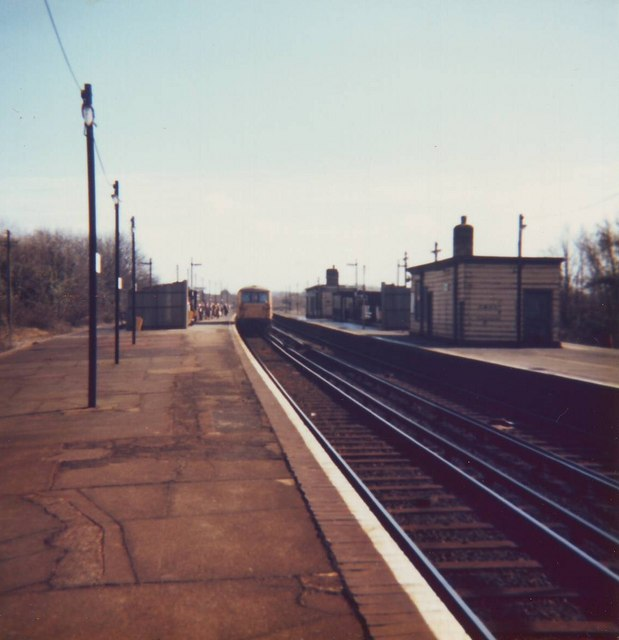
Station platforms of the second station in March 1986

The station closed in 1986 when a newer station opened 440 yards west, although caused controversy when the subway under the station connecting the platforms was also closed as it offered a short cut for non rail travellers to cross from one side of the town to the other without walking towards the high street and using the level crossing. The level crossing is the only means from crossing from one side of the town to the other. The street level building was demolished in May 2017.

=== Present station ===
The current building is the third station to be built in Polegate and is on the site of the original station. It was completed in 1986 by Network SouthEast, and officially opened by Ian Gow in 1987. The station has a booking hall, and three waiting rooms. A footbridge connects both platforms although step-free access is available by the Level Crossing. The site of the goods yard is now developed with a shopping precinct and car park to the north of the station and a housing estate to the south-east of the station.

The closed lines to Hailsham and Pevensey are still evident. The trackbed of the branch to Heathfield is now a cycle path – Cuckoo Trail – beginning at the north end of the town. The trackbed to Pevensey is mostly intact with the A22 road cutting through the route.

== Signal boxes ==
In its heyday, Polegate had three signal boxes, Polegate 'A' or West, Polegate 'B' or East and Polegate Crossing. Polegate 'A' signal box was situated at the western end of the station and controlled the junction for the Cuckoo Line to Hailsham and Eridge and the goods yard. Polegate 'B' signal box, situated at the eastern end of the station controlled the junction for Eastbourne and Hastings based services. Polegate Crossing which controlled the level crossing was abolished in February 2015. The Polegate Crossing signal box was subsequently demolished overnight between 14 and 18 November 2016.

== Services ==
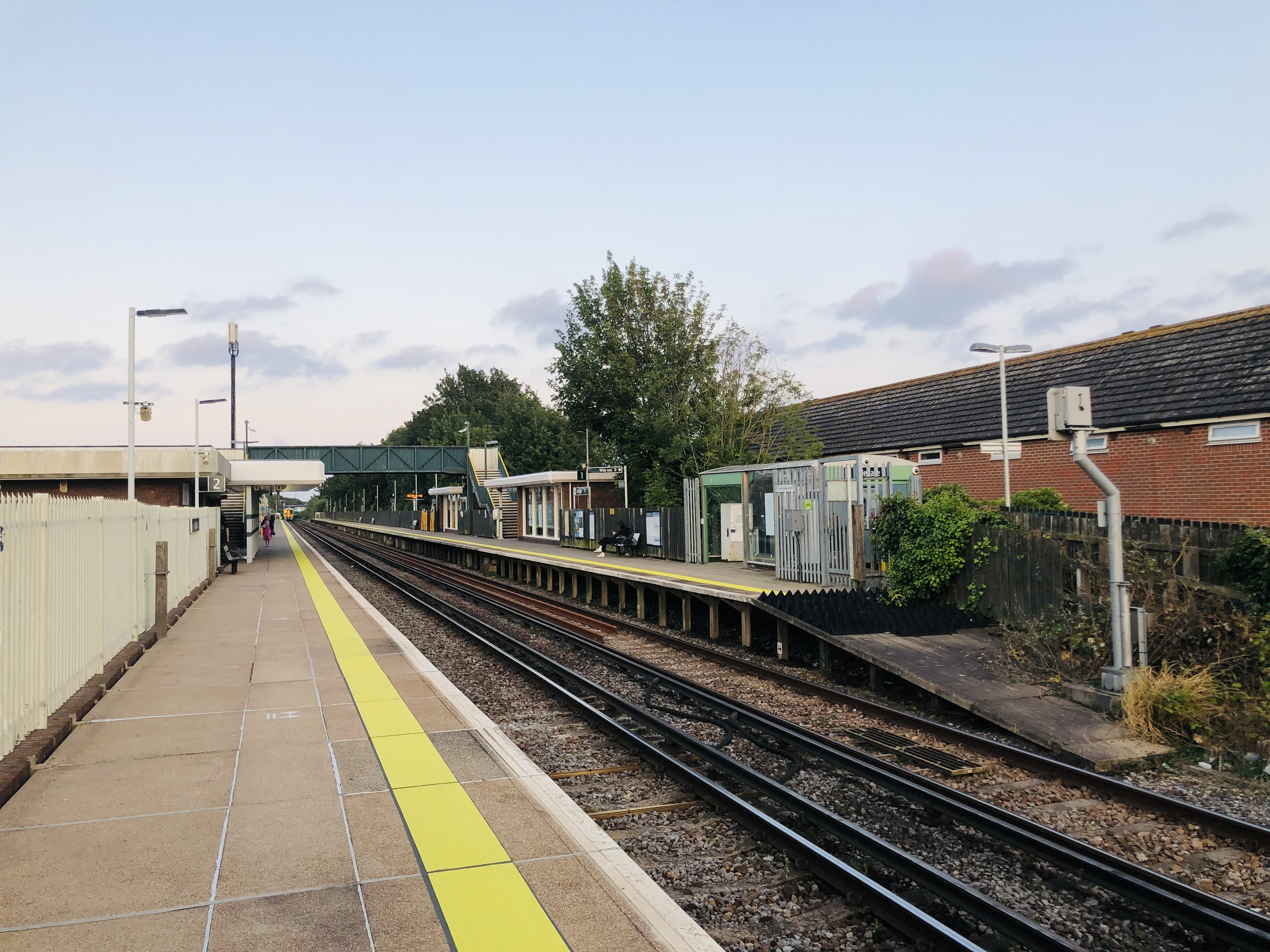
The platforms, looking east

All services at Polegate are operated by Southern using Class 377 EMUs.

The typical off-peak service in trains per hour is:

- 2 tph to London Victoria via Gatwick Airport
- 2 tph to Brighton
- 4 tph to Eastbourne, with two continuing to Ore

Until 2018, the station was served by hourly services through to Ashford International. These services were discontinued as part of the May 2018 timetable changes due to long journey times and insufficient rolling stock (the line to Ashford was served at the time by 2-car DMUs) which caused overcrowding particularly on the section between Brighton and Eastbourne. Since then, services to and from Ashford have only run as far as Eastbourne.

Preceding station	National Rail	Following station
Berwick or Lewes	Southern East Coastway Line	Hampden Park or Eastbourne
	Disused railways	
Hailsham	British Rail Southern Region Cuckoo Line	Pevensey & Westham or Hampden Park
	Historical railways	
Berwick	Brighton, Lewes & Hastings Railway East Coastway Line	Pevensey & Westham

== Station facilities ==
- Booking Office
- Three waiting rooms, one on Eastbourne platform and two on the Lewes platform
- Automated Ticket Gates on both platforms
- Automated announcements
- Two ticket issuing machines for selling tickets and collecting pre-paid tickets.
