= Hellingly Hospital =

Psychiatric hospital in Sussex, England

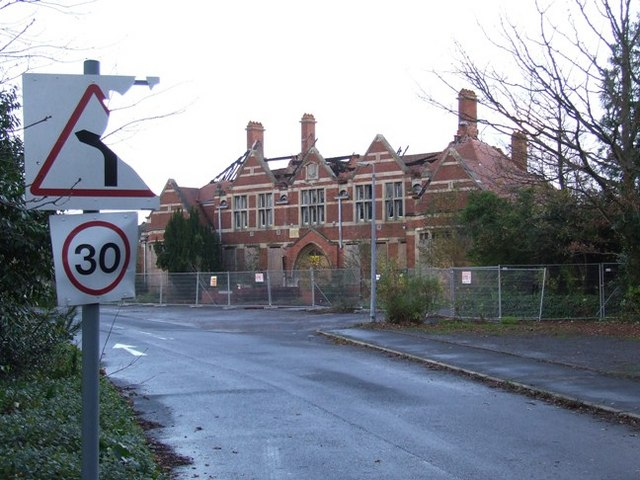
- The administration block prior to demolition

- Shown in East Sussex

Geography
- Location: Hellingly, East Sussex, England, United Kingdom
- Coordinates: 50°53′20″N 0°16′11″E

Organisation
- Care system: Public NHS

History
- Founded: 1898
- Closed: 1994

Links
- Lists: Hospitals in England

Hellingly Hospital, formerly the East Sussex County Asylum, was a large psychiatric hospital close to the village of Hellingly, east of Hailsham, in the English county of East Sussex.

== History ==
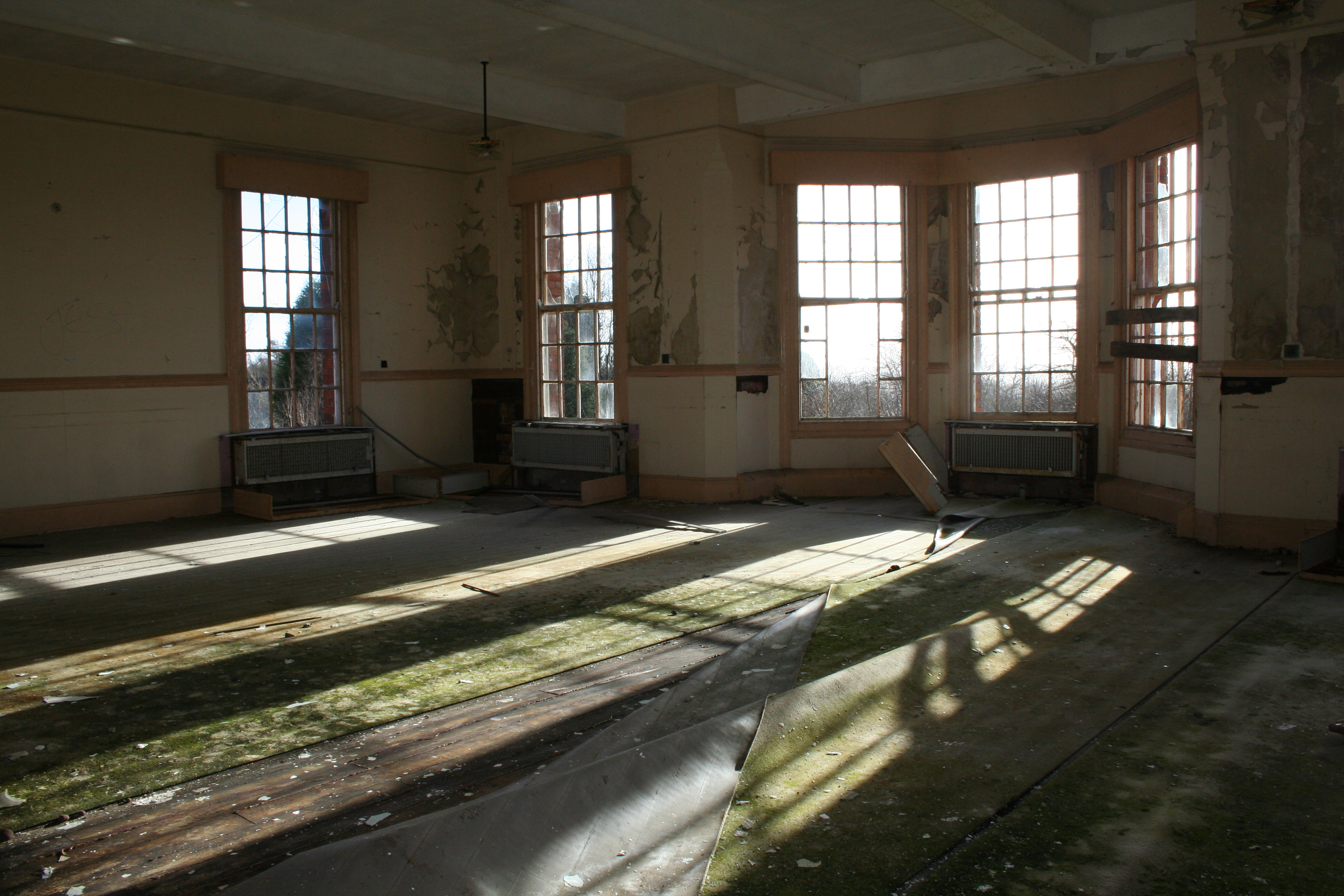
A day room typical of the hospital, with large bay windows to let as much sunlight in as possible

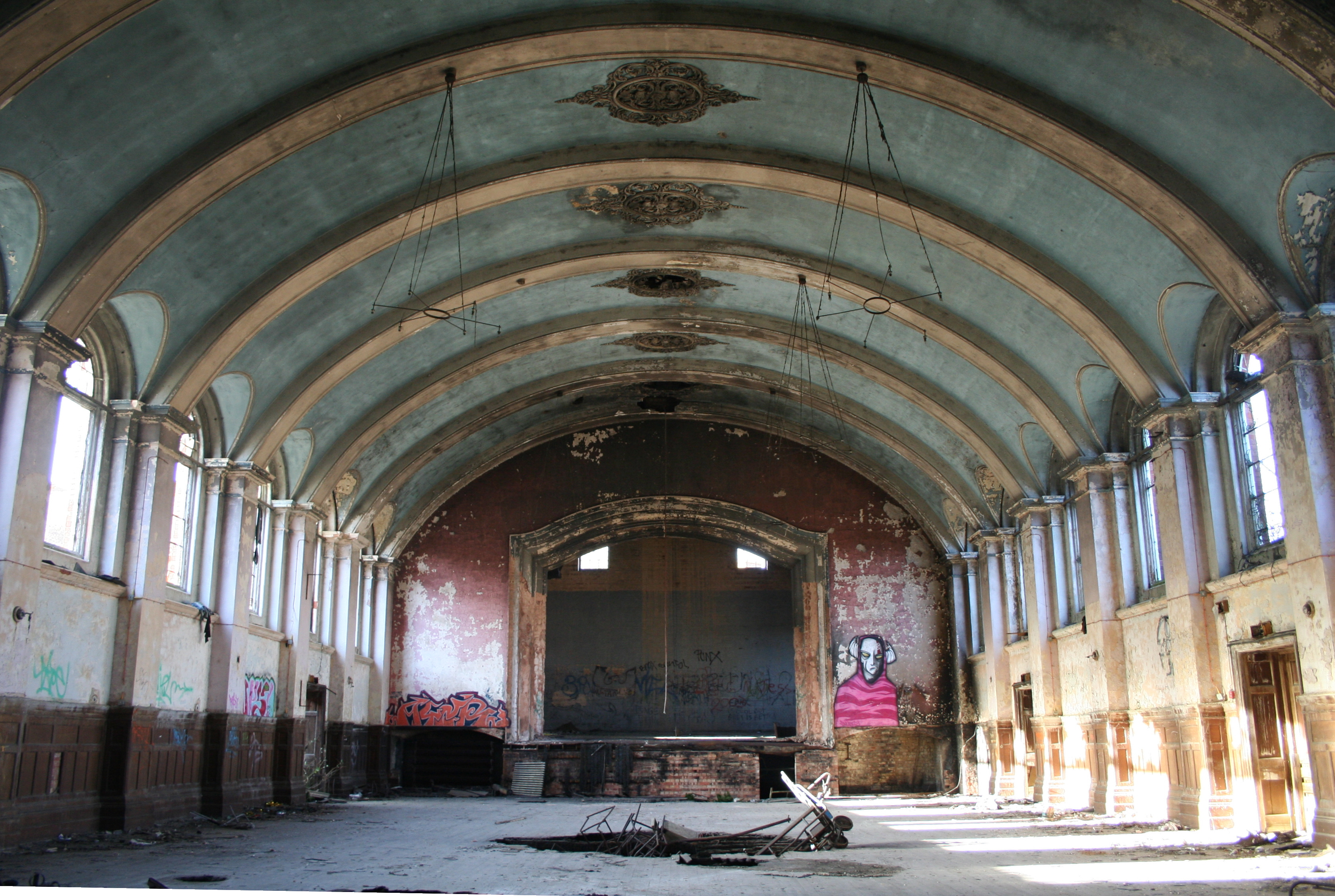
The hospital's main hall

The County Authority of East Sussex decided to build a new asylum at the turn of the twentieth century because of problems of overcrowding at the Haywards Heath Asylum, formerly the Sussex County Asylum. To that end, the County Council purchased the 400-acre (160 ha) Park Farm estate, a short distance from Hellingly village and railway station, from the earl of Chichester for £16,000. Construction began in 1898 and the new asylum was built to a compact arrow plan by George Thomas Hine, consultant architect to the Commissioners in Lunacy. The hospital opened on 20 July 1903 at a total cost of £353,400.

The main complex comprised an administrative block, central stores, kitchens, a recreation hall and the assistant medical officer's residence. Like most large institutions of that age and type, the sexes were separated into separate accommodation and work areas. To the west of the central block stood the male wards, workshops, boiler house, water tower and maintenance department. The female wards were located on the east side of the hospital along with the laundry, sewing room and a nurses' home. All of the buildings in the main complex were linked by an extensive network of corridors.

To the north of the main buildings were a chapel and four further villas including one for male working patients, two for female working patients and another for mentally defective children. Park House, a hospital annexe for acute cases was located to the southwest of the main asylum and a small isolation hospital for infectious diseases was placed in the woods to the far north-west of the grounds to reduce the risk of infection. The estate plan incorporated two driveways: one from the south-west lined with medical officers' residences and the acute hospital and another second from the south routed via the farm, male farm-workers' villa and married attendants' cottages.

The hospital had its own electric tramway, the Hellingly Hospital Railway. The line led from the Hellingly Station to the boilerhouse and was used principally for transporting coal for the heating boilers and electricity plant. The line closed to passenger traffic in 1930 and the track was lifted in 1959 at which time the hospital boilers were converted from coal to oil fuel.

Post-war developments included the conversion of the Superintendent's residence to a nurse's home, the closure of the hospital farm, the construction of Tennyson house and the staff social club. During the mid-1980s, Hellingly was chosen as one of five mental hospital sites in the south east of England to accommodate a medium secure unit, known as Ashen Hill and located to the east of the main buildings and villas. Despite these developments, patient numbers were already declining and the entire main building was vacated and closed in 1994.

After closure, most of the buildings fell into rapid decline, suffering from arson, vandalism and theft. By 2003 the site had become popular with urban explorers who came to document the vast abandoned complex. In mid-2010, work began to clear the site for new housing. Only a few of the original buildings now remain, although the Ashen Hill secure unit continued to operate on site until early 2012. Another low secure unit is on the site known as Southview which was opened in 1995. The new Medium secure unit, known as The Hellingly Centre opened in April 2012, with 46 beds split between 3 wards at a cost of £17.5 million. Plans are underway for more units alongside the new housing.

== See also ==
- Healthcare in Sussex
- List of hospitals in England
