= Cuckoo Line =

Defunct railway line in East Sussex, England

Coordinates: 50.831°N 0.253°E

Overview
- Status: Disused
- Owner: LB&SCR; Southern Railway; British Railways
- Locale: East Sussex and Kent.
- Termini: Polegate; Eridge
- Stations: 8

Service
- Type: Branch Line
- System: National Rail Network
- Services: Eastbourne to Tonbridge
- Depot(s): Eastbourne Depot; Tunbridge Wells West

History
- Opened: 1880
- Closed: 1965-1968

Technical
- Number of tracks: Single
- Track gauge: 4 ft 8 1/2 in (1,435 mm) standard gauge

The Cuckoo Line is an informal name for the now defunct railway service which linked Polegate and Eridge in East Sussex, England, from 1880 to 1968. It was nicknamed the Cuckoo Line by drivers, from a tradition observed at the annual fair at Heathfield, a station on the route. At the fair, which was held each April, a lady would release a cuckoo from a basket, it being supposedly the 'first cuckoo of spring'. The railway line served the following Sussex communities: Polegate, Hailsham, Hellingly, Horam for Waldron, Heathfield, Mayfield, Rotherfield and Eridge. Services continued through Eridge and onward via Groombridge to Tunbridge Wells.

The Hailsham-Eridge section closed in 1965, the Polegate-Hailsham branch surviving until 1968. Eridge-Tunbridge Wells closed in 1985, and this line has been resurrected as the Spa Valley Railway.

== History ==
The Cuckoo Line was built by the London Brighton and South Coast Railway (LB&SCR) in two sections, starting with the branch from Polegate to Hailsham which opened to traffic on 14 May 1849. It diverged from the main Eastbourne to London line at Polegate, and ran northwards on a single track to the market town of Hailsham, which was the terminus for 31 years until the line through to Eridge had been completed by Frederick Banister; which opened to traffic to Heathfield on 5 April 1880 and to Eridge in September 1880. The station buildings were designed by Banister's son-in-law, Thomas Myres.

The line then passed through the villages of Hellingly (where a link to the Hellingly Hospital Railway joined the route, worked by overhead electric traction), Horam, Heathfield, Mayfield, Rotherfield & Mark Cross, then via Redgate Mill Junction to join the Oxted Line for Eridge. The route continued north-eastwards, leaving the Oxted Line at Birchden Junction heading for Groombridge, High Rocks Halt and eventually Tunbridge Wells West. Through trains could continue on the single-track connection through Grove Tunnel to join the Hastings Line (heading towards Tunbridge Wells Central) at Grove Junction

Horam station was originally built as Horeham Road. In 1900 it was renamed Waldron & Horeham Road. Over the years, Horeham changed to Horam as the hamlet grew around the station, prompted by growth including an Express Dairies depot, and the name changed again in 1935, before becoming simply Horam in September 1953.

The line from Three Bridges to Tunbridge Wells (via East Grinstead High Level and Groombridge) opened on 1 October 1866, with the connecting line from Uckfield via Eridge opening on 3 August 1868. The connection between the LBSCR station at Tunbridge Wells West and Tunbridge Wells Central opened on 1 February 1876. This single-line section passed through the short Grove Tunnel to Grove Junction, sited a little south of the South Eastern Railway station on its Hastings Line. In 1881 a new track alignment was built between Polegate and Hailsham allowing trains to run into Polegate at the west end of the station and direct to Eastbourne.

At the 'Grouping' in 1923, the railway passed into the control of the Southern Railway. When the Southern Railway was nationalised in 1948, the line became part of the Southern Region of British Railways.

=== Incidents ===
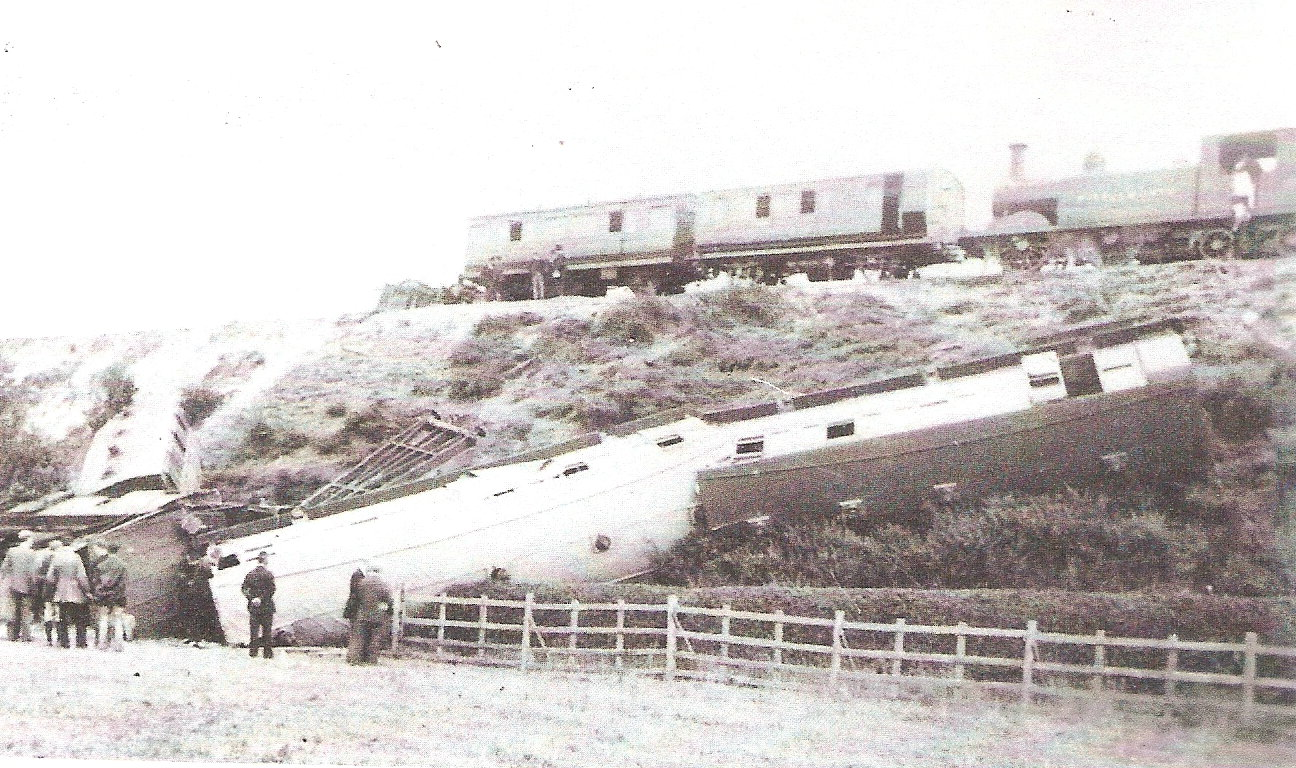
D1 Class No. 297 Bonchurch and train, derailed at Tooth's Bank, North of Heathfield, September 1897.

The line had a good safety record: there was only one reported accident on the line. On 1 September 1897 at Tooth's Bank, 2 miles north of Heathfield, the 08:18am service from Eastbourne was running around 4 minutes late and was trying to pick up time in order to meet a connecting train at Groombridge. As the train entered the curve at around 40 mph it left the tracks. Driver James McKinlay was killed and Fireman Lewis Minns seriously injured, whilst 30 passengers suffered minor injuries. At the subsequent inquiry, Lt. Col. G. W. Addison reported that the main cause of the accident was excessive speed as the driver was attempting to make up lost time in order to make a connection at Groombridge. The track itself was in poor shape with many rotten sleepers and "curves having irregular elevation" which contributed to the accident. Following the inquiry, much of the track was relaid and the train scheduling was altered.

In April 1968 a lorry collided with a low road bridge under the line at Horsebridge north of Hailsham damaging the bridge causing immediate closure of the line. As the freight train service between Hailsham and Heathfield was due to be withdrawn the following month it was not considered worthwhile repairing the bridge so the line was prematurely abandoned forthwith. Some wagons isolated at Heathfield goods yard were cut up on site.

=== Closure ===
Following the Beeching Report in 1963, the line was recommended for closure. The section from Eridge to Hailsham was closed to passenger traffic in 1965 (the section between Heathfield and Hailsham remaining open for freight until 1968), whilst the short branch from Polegate to Hailsham remained open until 8 September 1968. The closure of this section was hotly disputed – even British Railways itself agreeing that Hailsham was a growing town and that buses would be unable to cope with the demands of the increasing population.

The line between Eridge and Tunbridge Wells West remained open until 1985. Despite having survived 'Beeching', no money was spent on the line and British Rail regarded a track and signalling upgrade to be unviable. Closure was announced in February 1985, and the last passenger trains ran on 6 July 1985. Grove Junction was removed the day after closure, but the depot at Tunbridge Wells West remained in use for another month.

== Preservation ==
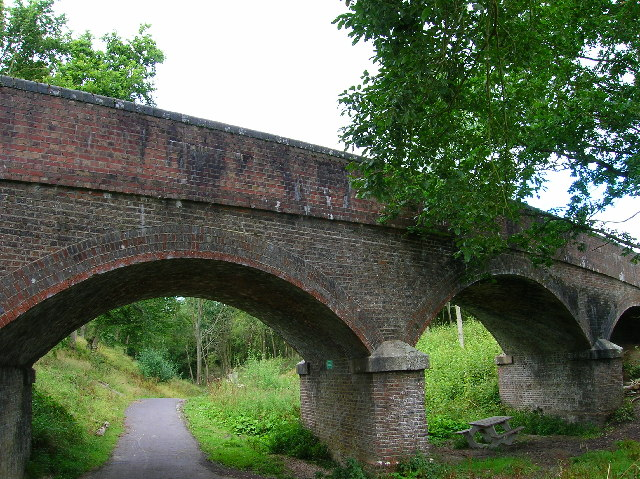
Shawpits Bridge, near Hellingly

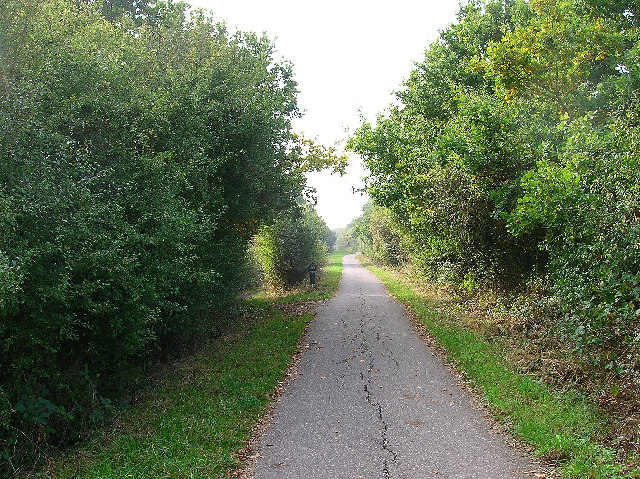
Cuckoo Trail between Polegate and Hailsham

A footpath and cycleway known as The Cuckoo Trail runs uses much of the former railway between Polegate and Heathfield. Polegate retains a railway station, albeit on a different site to that formerly used by Cuckoo Line trains, whilst the site of the station in Hailsham is now occupied by a housing estate and a public car park. Hellingly station (used in the 1964 film Smokescreen) survives as a private residence. At Horam sections of the platforms are preserved including a nameboard. Heathfield station building is now a cafe but the site of the platforms is now occupied by industrial units. At Mayfield the station building survives as a private residence but the trackbed has now been removed and replaced by the A267 Mayfield bypass, with some of the spoil used to fill the tunnel at Argos Hill. Rotherfield and Mark Cross station is a private residence. Soon after closure of the Eridge to Tunbridge Wells West section, a preservation society was formed with the intention of reinstating the passenger service on the line. The Tunbridge Wells and Eridge Railway Preservation Society (TWERPS) acquired the line in March 1996 and by December 1996 had started to run a steam-hauled passenger service along part of the route. The line has been marketed as the Spa Valley Railway and it has gradually extended services with the most recent section to Eridge opening on 25 March 2011.

In January 2019, Campaign for Better Transport released a report identifying the line was listed as Priority 2 for reopening. Priority 2 is for those lines which require further development or a change in circumstances (such as housing developments).

== See also ==
- List of closed railway stations in Britain
- Spa Valley Railway
- Cuckoo Trail
