= Polegate =

Town in East Sussex, England

Coordinates: 50.8216°N 0.2442°E

- Town
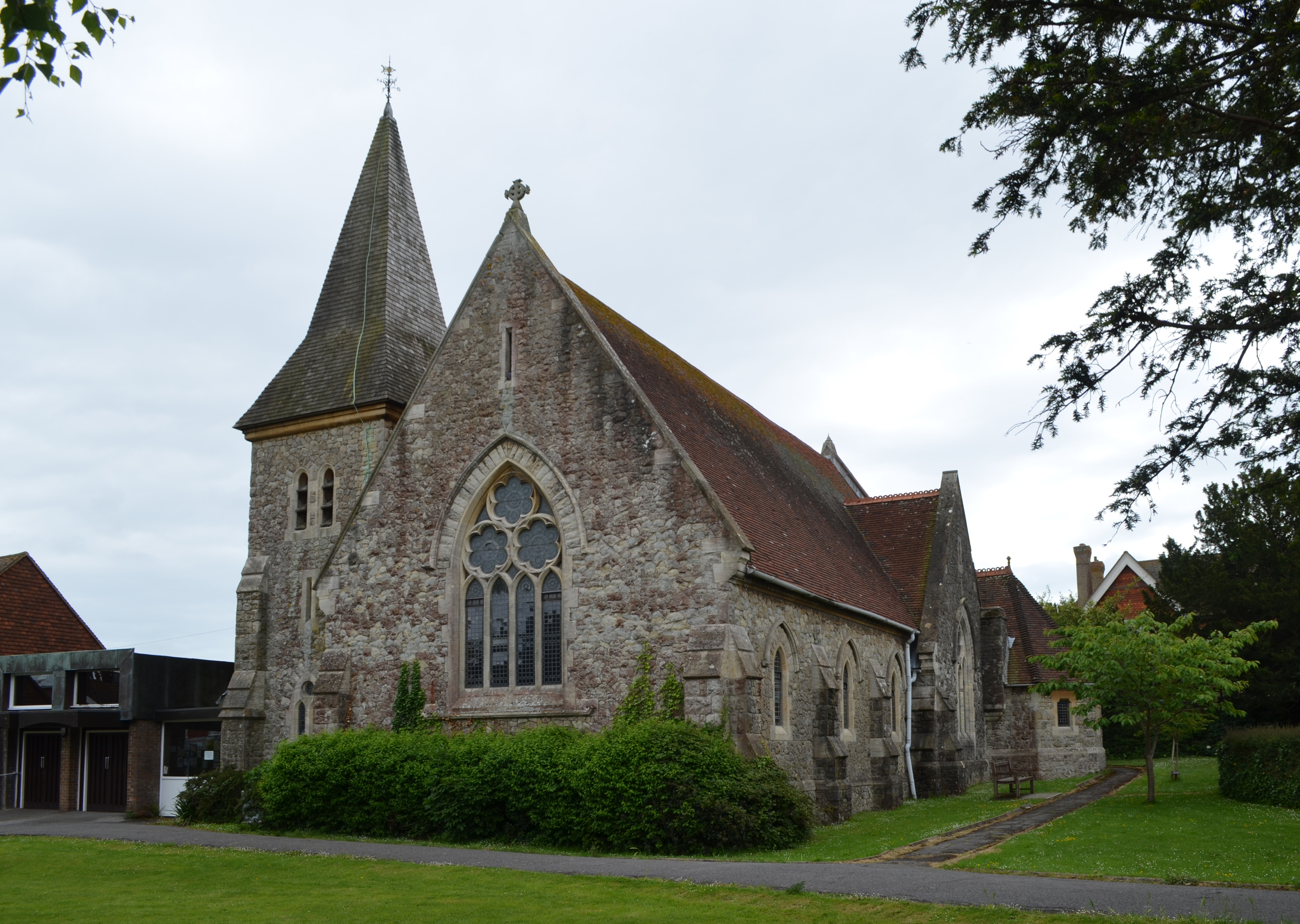
- St John's Church

- Location within East Sussex
- Area: 7.3 km^{2} (2.8 sq mi)
- Population: 9,300 (2021)
  - Density: 2,853/sq mi (1,102/km^{2})
- OS grid reference: TQ587058
  - London: 49 miles (79 km) NNW
- Civil parish: Polegate
- District: Wealden
- Shire county: East Sussex
- Region: South East
- Country: England
- Sovereign state: United Kingdom
- Post town: POLEGATE
- Postcode district: BN26
- Dialling code: 01323
- Police: Sussex
- Fire: East Sussex
- Ambulance: South East Coast
- UK Parliament: Lewes
- Website: http://www.polegate-tc.co.uk/

Polegate is a town and civil parish in the Wealden District of East Sussex, England, United Kingdom. It is part of the greater area of Eastbourne, which is located around four miles (7 km) south. The 2011 census put the civil parish of Polegate at a population of 8,586, with 41.2% aged 65 and over.

== History ==
Until the coming of the railways in the 1840s, Polegate was a small settlement within the parish of Hailsham. The Roman road from Pevensey to Lewes passed through here, and the turnpike between London and Eastbourne was developed in the 18th century; but it was the opening of the railway between Lewes and Hastings, with later branches to Eastbourne and Hailsham, that meant growth for Polegate. It became a significant junction, with a freight terminal serving both the nearby market town of Hailsham and the local brick making industry. The town grew partly to accommodate the railway employees.

In the 12th century, the Premonstratensian order of monks occupied Otham Abbey in the parish, before relocating around 1208 to Bayham Abbey, near Lamberhurst. Two buildings remain of that time, Otteham Court and its Chapel.

In 1851 a church school was established in Polegate.

St John's Church was opened on 10 November 1876. The site of the church and the parsonage was donated by Mr Fuller-Meyrick, owner of the Brightling Park Estate. The separate parish of St John's was formed on 26 October 1937, with the first vicar being Rev. John Catterall Salisbury (he had been curate since 1933). In 2013 the Parsonage building in Church Road was sold by the Diocese.

In the 21st century, with the closure of the line to Hailsham and the once direct route to Hastings, its importance as a railway hub has gone. It remains a road junction, with the erstwhile turnpike now being the A22 road; the junction with the A27 lies within the town boundary.

There are four streets in today's Polegate named for the Levett family (Levett Close, Levett Road, Levett Avenue and Levett Way). The Anglo-Norman family were early Sussex landowners, and held manors and lands across the county, including Firle, Bodiam, Hollington and elsewhere. The family's lands were carried into the families of Gildredge (and then to the Davies-Gilbert family of Eastbourne), the Eversfields of St. Leonards-on-Sea, the Ashburnhams, the Chaloners and others.

== Geography ==
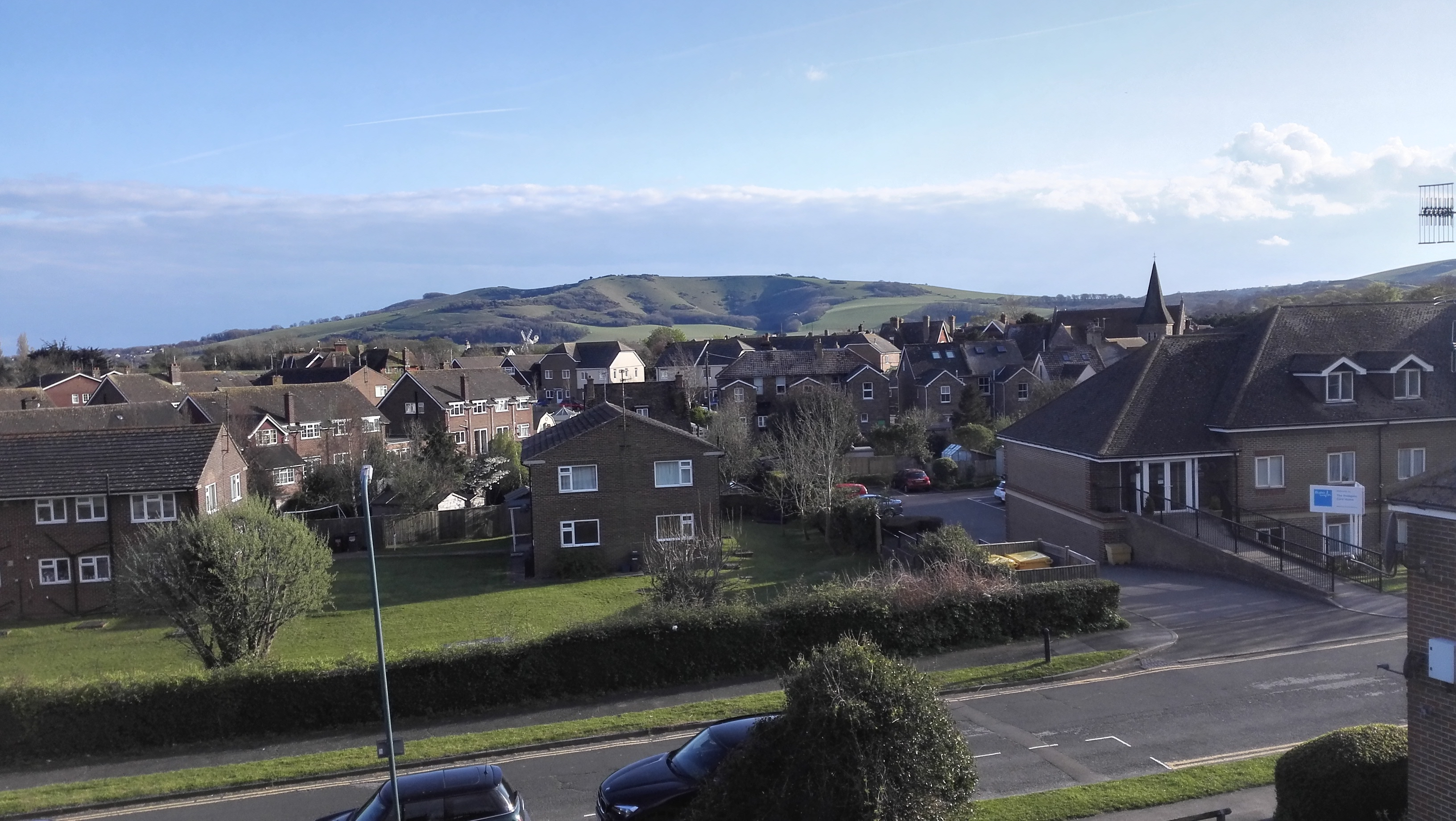
South Downs to the south of the town

Polegate is located on a ridge in the gap between the Weald to the north and the South Downs. To the east lie the Pevensey Levels, the onetime bay now converted into farmland with the buildup of the coastal shingle bank during the early Middle Ages. Both the roads and the railway use the gap.

The town is gradually becoming part of the greater Eastbourne conurbation, connecting with Willingdon to the south. Many of the town's working population work away: either in Eastbourne or Willingdon. Due to its location situated on the corner of the A27 and A22, it allows easy access to larger cities like Brighton and Hastings in less than an hour.

=== Climate ===
Climate in this area has mild differences between highs and lows, and there is adequate rainfall year-round. The Köppen Climate Classification subtype for this climate is "Cfb" (Marine West Coast Climate/Oceanic climate).

Climate data for Polegate, UK
Month	Jan	Feb	Mar	Apr	May	Jun	Jul	Aug	Sep	Oct	Nov	Dec	Year
Mean daily maximum °C (°F)	8 (46)	8 (46)	9 (48)	11 (52)	15 (59)	17 (63)	19 (66)	20 (68)	18 (64)	14 (57)	11 (52)	8 (46)	13 (55)
Mean daily minimum °C (°F)	5 (41)	4 (39)	6 (43)	7 (45)	10 (50)	12 (54)	15 (59)	15 (59)	13 (55)	10 (50)	7 (45)	5 (41)	9 (48)
Average precipitation days	7	13	14	13	9	11	9	9	13	14	15	17	154
Source: Weatherbase

== Governance ==
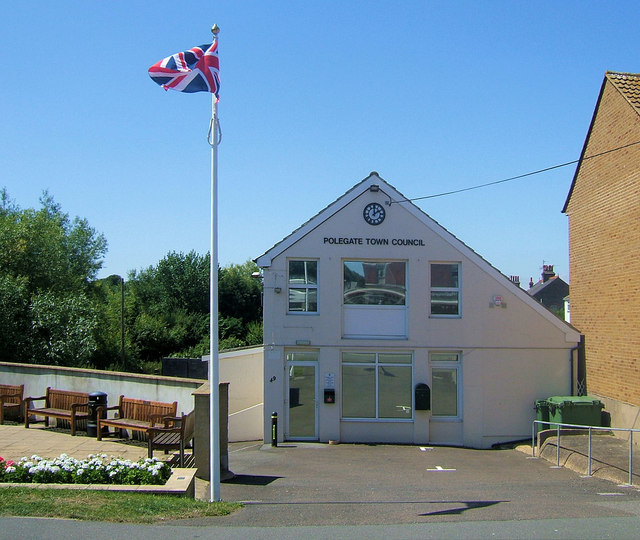
Polegate Town Hall and Council offices

Polegate is split into two wards for local elections, North and South Polegate. North Polegate with 4000 electors is twice the size of South Polegate's 2000 electors, returning twice as many councillors. The Parish is represented at the lowest tier by Polegate Town Council. Fifteen councillors are elected from the two wards every four years. Public meetings are held monthly at the council chambers in Polegate. The 2007 election returned twelve councillors representing the Polegate residents association, two Liberal Democrats and an Independent.

The district council for Polegate is Wealden District Council. District council elections are held every four years. Fifty-five councillors in total are elected, three of these from the Polegate wards. The May 2007 election returned 34 Conservative, 12 Liberal Democrat, 3 Independent Democrat, 3 Wealden Independent, 2 Green Party and 1 no party allegiance. The Polegate councillors parties were 2 Liberal Democrats and 1 Independent Democrat.

The next tier of government is the East Sussex County Council with responsibility for education, libraries, social services, civil registration, trading standards and transport. Elections for the County Council are held every four years. For these elections Polegate is combined with Willingdon and East Dean to return two seats. The 2009 East Sussex County Council election resulted in 29 Conservatives, 13 Liberal Democrats, 4 Labour and 3 Independent, of which the Polegate, Willingdon and East Dean ward provided two Independent councillors.

Polegate is represented in the UK Parliament by the Lewes constituency. The current serving MP is the Liberal Democrat James MacCleary who won the seat in the 2024 general election.

Prior to Brexit in 2020, the village was part of the South East England constituency in the European Parliament.

== Economy ==
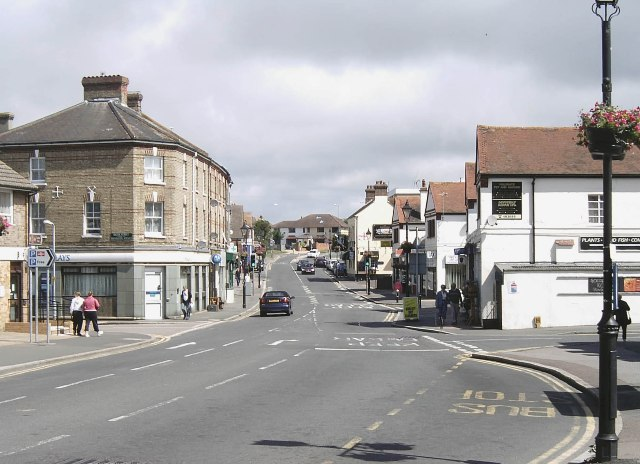
High Street in Polegate

Chaucer Industrial Business Park Estate is located on Dittons Road where the major part of Polegate's industrial businesses are located. A number of small-town shops and businesses occupy the High Street, including a supermarket, hair dressers and convenience store, as well a Premier Inn hotel to the north of the town.

== Attractions ==
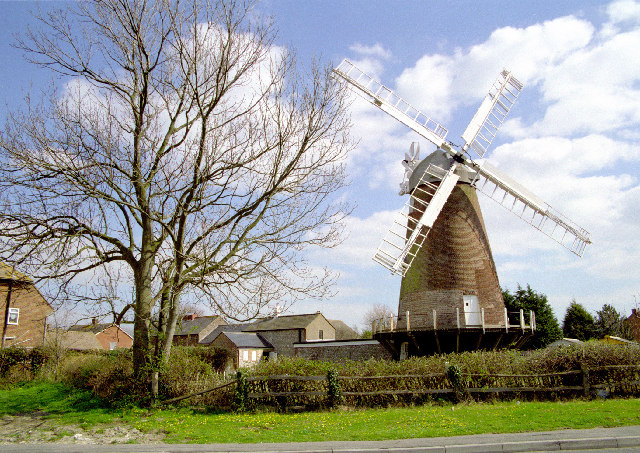
Polegate Windmill

The tower windmill was built in 1817. It is now a working museum.

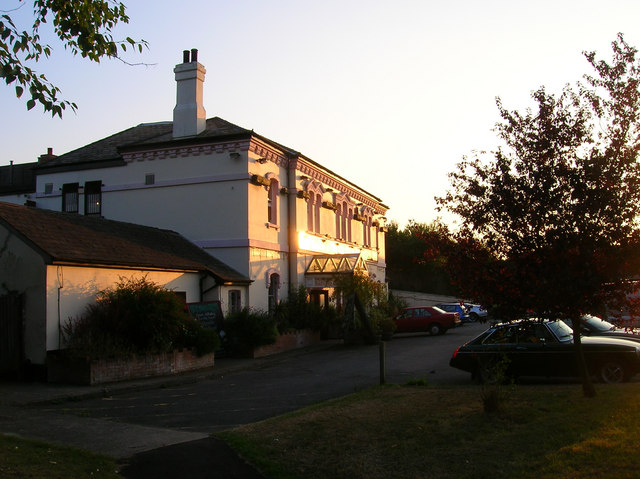
Old Polegate Station before it was demolished in 2017

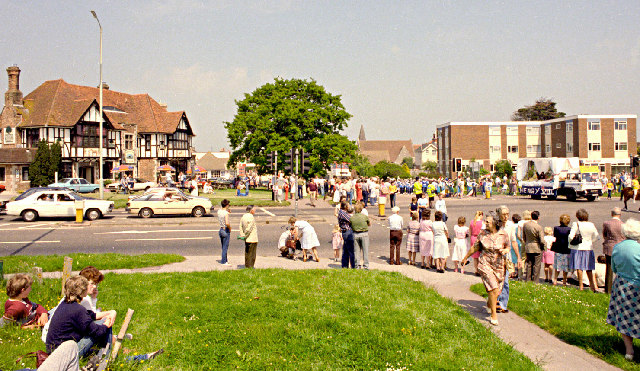
Polegate crossroads, Horse and Groom pub and Polegate annual carnival procession

== Sport and leisure ==
=== Recreation ===
There are two recreation grounds in Polegate, The Brightling Road Recreation Ground to the east of the town and The War Memorial Recreation Ground so the south of the town in Wannock Road.

- The Brightling Road Recreation Ground, also known as the William Daily Recreation Ground, has a BMX track, a skate park and a woodland area with open ground for sports.
- The War Memorial Recreation Ground is an open field with a basketball hoop and a playground for children.

There are also two Sustrans cycle paths on the National Cycle Network: route 2 between Dover and St Austell, and route 21 between Greenwich and Eastbourne.

=== Sports clubs ===
The local football team, Polegate Town FC, plays each Saturday at the War Memorial Recreational Ground. The club has two teams, with the first team playing in the Mid Sussex League Championship Division, and the second team in Division 5. The club reformed in 2006 after an absence of five years without a Polegate team. In 2008, the club moved back to the recreation ground, having played its first two seasons on Eastbourne Council pitches. The club have enjoyed various successes since reforming, most recently winning the Blacklands Finance Challenge Cup. In 2015 the club celebrated its centenary, as the earliest known Polegate team was first established in 1915: a photo of this team can be seen in the pavilion at the War Memorial Recreational Ground.

Polegate also have a successful cricket team, Polegate and Stone Cross Cricket Club, which uses the same pitch during the summer months.

== Transport ==
=== Rail ===
The railway arrived in Polegate in 1846, built by the London Brighton and South Coast Railway on the extension from Brighton to Hastings. In 1849 branches extended to Eastbourne and Hailsham (later to Eridge). The line to Hailsham was nicknamed the Cuckoo Line by railway workers. Both that and the direct link to Hastings are now closed. The present Polegate railway station is served by Southern, with regular train services to London, Brighton, Eastbourne and Hastings.

=== Buses ===
Both local and long distance bus services serve Polegate, all originating from Eastbourne and expanding to destinations such as Pevensey, Lewes, Brighton, Tunbridge Wells, Uckfield and Gatwick Airport. Bus services are provided by

- Brighton & Hove: 11X and 28
- Compass Travel: Route 125
- Cuckmere Buses: Routes 24, 25, 26, 43, 44 and 48
- Metrobus: 500
- Stagecoach South East: Routes 6, 51, 52 and 53

=== Other ===
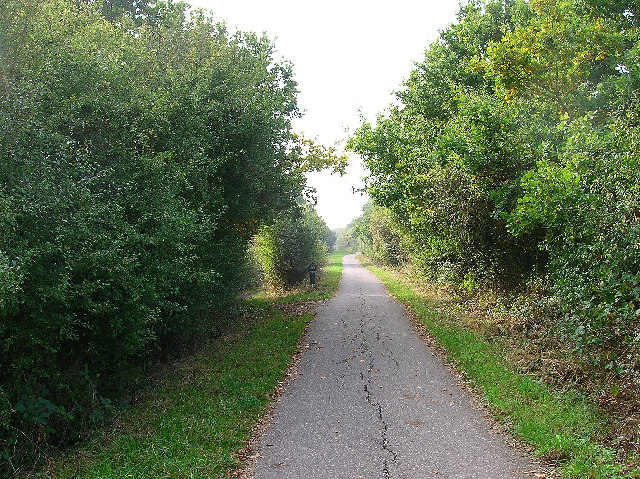
Cuckoo Trail between Polegate and Hailsham

The long-distance footpath, the Cuckoo Trail passes through the parish which forms part of the Sustrans National Cycle Route 21 between Pevensey and Greenwich, as does the National Cycle Route 2 between Dover and St Austell. Both routes form part of the Avenue Verte cycle route between London and Paris.

== Education ==
State primary education is served by Polegate Primary School.

== Religion ==
There are four churches in Polegate: the Church of England parish church, dedicated to St John; the Roman Catholic church of St George; a Seventh-day Adventist Church; and a United Reformed Church. Quakers also meet at the Bernard Baron Homes.

== Media ==
Polegate is covered by BBC Sussex, Seahaven FM, More Radio Eastbourne and Heart South. Local newspapers include the Eastbourne Herald, Eastbourne Gazette, Hailsham Gazette and the Sussex Express; all published by Beckett Newspapers. Local television news programmes are BBC South East Today and ITV News Meridian.

== Twinnings ==
Polegate formed a twinning association in 1981 and is twinned with two towns:

- Saintry-sur-Seine, France (1991)
- Appen, Germany (1981)

== Notable residents ==
- David Dimbleby, television commentator, who included the town as a destination in his 2007 television series How We Built Britain
- Denis Healey, politician and writer
- Tim Rice-Oxley from the band Keane
- Trevor Geer, speedway rider and manager for the Eastbourne Eagles Speedway team
