= Cuckoo Trail =

Footpath and cycleway in East Sussex, England

The Cuckoo Trail
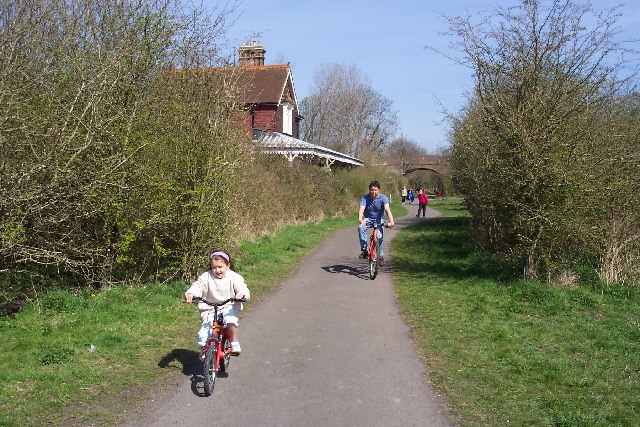
- Length: 14 mi (23 km)
- Location: East Sussex, England
- Trailheads: Hampden Park; 50°48′04″N 0°17′42″E; Heathfield; 50°58′07″N 0°15′06″E
- Use: Hiking, Cycling, Walking

The Cuckoo Trail is a 14-mile (23 km) footpath and cycleway which runs from Hampden Park to Heathfield in East Sussex. It passes through the towns of Polegate and Hailsham, as well as the villages of Hellingly and Horam.

== History ==
The Trail largely follows the route of a disused railway line, the Cuckoo Line, which opened in 1880 and ran between Eridge and Polegate railway stations, creating a direct route between Eastbourne and London. It obtained its name from the tradition that the first cuckoo in Spring was heard at the Heathfield Fair. The line closed in 1968 under the programme of closures put forward by Forest Row resident and British Transport Commission Chairman Richard Beeching.

In 1981, the route of the old railway line to the south of Heathfield was purchased by Wealden District Council and East Sussex County Council. From 1990 Sustrans developed the route along with District Council and the County Council into a shared track for walkers and cyclists, with horses also allowed on some sections. An extension was constructed to the south into Eastbourne and the trail became part of National Cycle Network Route 21. The Trail is currently used by around 200,000 people per year and serves as a traffic-free route between several local schools. It is jointly managed by the latter in conjunction with East Sussex County Council.

Along the route of the Trail are six original sculptures which act as mileposts. In May 1993, a dozen wooden benches were installed which had been hand-carved by a local artist out of trees felled during the Great Storm of 1987. In 2003, a five-year £65,000 package of grants for improvements to the Cuckoo Trail was awarded as part of the Woodland Grant Scheme. Part of these funds went towards the resurfacing of the Trail as far as Heathfield in October 2006.

== Extension north ==
As of 2008, the Cuckoo Trail remains incomplete. The remaining section of the disused railway line north of Heathfield is largely inaccessible and in the ownership of 12 different individuals who have resisted attempts to establish a path/cycleway over their land. Until 1986, East Sussex County Council owned 11 miles (18 km) of the Cuckoo Trail to the south of Mayfield but, seeking to reduce expenditure, it abandoned the idea of reopening it as a public footpath, and parcels of land were sold off in a piecemeal fashion.

The trail has therefore been re-routed from Heathfield over nearby roads, diverging from the railway alignment to join the A265 at Mutton Hall Hill before heading north on Newick Lane through Mayfield town centre. That route caused controversy amongst local residents.

The inability to extend the trail north means that it cannot reach Groombridge and link with the Forest Way, another footpath and bridleway following the route of a disused railway line. Numerous reports have been prepared which identified various routes which would connect with the Forest Way, from a Sustrans report in 1995, to three Owen Williams reports in 1998 and 1999, and finally an Atkins feasibility study in 2006, which confirmed that reusing the old railway line would be the best way forward, with the alternative on-road route as a short-term means of access to Groombridge.

As part of the extension north, the 265-yard (242 m) Heathfield Tunnel was repaired and restored in 1997, funded by a derelict land grant of £198,000 from English Partnerships and a contribution of £60,000 from Wealden District Council. Gates were fitted to the tunnel in 1999 at a cost of £22,000 which allowed access to be restricted to daylight hours. Access became unrestricted from 2002 but ceased entirely following an alleged rape incident on 12 March 2005. A trial reopening period began on 26 March 2007. In 2019, Wealden District Council was contacted due to the full closure of the tunnel. The response was: "due to constant vandalism and anti-social behaviour, the tunnel is to remain closed indefinitely with no plans to look into it".
