= Stone Cross Halt railway station =

Disused railway station in Stone Cross, Wealden

Stone Cross Halt

General information
- Location: Stone Cross, Wealden; England
- Coordinates: 50.813°N 0.2949°E
- Grid reference: TQ617040
- Platforms: 2

Other information
- Status: Disused

History
- Original company: London Brighton and South Coast Railway
- Pre-grouping: London Brighton and South Coast Railway
- Post-grouping: Southern Railway

Key dates
- 11 September 1905: Opened
- 7 July 1935: Closed
Location

Stone Cross Halt railway station served Stone Cross, in the district of Wealden, East Sussex, England from 1905 to 1935 on the East Coastway Line.

== History ==
The station opened on 11 September 1905 by the London Brighton and South Coast Railway. The halt was situated between Polegate and Hastings. The station closed on 7 July 1935. There was a petition raised by the Liberal Democrats to reopen the station as Langney station, but the campaign has been called off.

However these plans look to have been revived and Eastbourne council leader David Tutt said, “One issue that I am pressing for as part of this work is the inclusion of a new station at Stone Cross.

“This is not a new idea, indeed along with my colleague Alan Shuttleworth, we have been campaigning for this for decades as it would serve much of the eastern end of Eastbourne and help ease congestion of cars travelling to the town centre.”

Preceding station	Historical railways	Following station
Polegate or Hampden Park	London Brighton and South Coast Railway; East Coastway Line	Pevensey & Westham
