= Eastbourne rail crash =

1958 railway accident in England

Details
- Date: 25 August 1958; 07:29
- Location: Eastbourne
- Coordinates: 50.7703°N 0.2831°E
- Country: England
- Line: East Coastway (BR Southern Region)
- Incident type: Collision
- Cause: Driver's error

Statistics
- Trains: 2
- Passengers: 186
- Deaths: 5
- Injured: 22 serious + 19 minor

The Eastbourne rail crash was an accident on the British railway system which occurred on 25 August 1958 at Eastbourne railway station in East Sussex. The accident killed five people and injured 41 others. Eastbourne station is a terminus station with services to Hastings, Brighton, London Victoria. At the time of the accident, there was a further service to Tonbridge via the Cuckoo Line. It was then common for services from Hastings to Brighton to enter Eastbourne and reverse to carry on its journey. Trains between Hastings and Brighton have resumed to do this, while services between London Victoria and Ore still do this today, with some calling at Hampden Park twice and an hourly service to Ashford International starting from Eastbourne.

== The accident ==
On Monday, 25 August 1958, at 7:27 a.m., the 7:45 p.m. sleeper-car steam train originating from Glasgow "ran past the home signal at Eastbourne at danger." A second train, the 6:47 a.m. multiple-unit, 12-coach, electric passenger train from Ore to London Bridge station, was at the number 4 platform at the Eastbourne station awaiting departure. The first train was carrying 36 passengers and the second 150 passengers. After passing the home signal, the steam train struck the EMU travelling at a speed of about 25 m.p.h.

The 06:47 Ore to London Bridge service was about to depart Platform 4. Although scheduled to depart Eastbourne at 07:25, it was running four minutes late. The train had only started to leave when the 19:45 Glasgow to Eastbourne car sleeper service collided head on at about 25 miles per hour (40 km/h). The sleeper train had been running twelve minutes late on leaving Mitre Bridge Junction, London, where the locomotives are changed and had arrived at Polegate six minutes late. It left Polegate on time and on approaching Eastbourne was signal checked. Driver Alfred Wembridge failed to see the home signal was set at 'danger' and drove straight through the points, into the path of the oncoming London Bridge service.

== Details ==
Composition of trains:

- The 06:47 train from Ore to London Bridge was made of 12 coaches from two electric multiple units, formed by a 6PUL unit 3014 and a 6PAN unit 3032.
- The 19:47 Glasgow to Eastbourne car sleeper consisted of 16 vehicles, two coaches, three sleeping cars, ten vans for luggage and motor cars and a guards van at the rear and was hauled by a Standard Class 5 4-6-0 tender engine, No. 73042.

The official accident report stated that the front carriage of the London Bridge train telescoped onto the second coach, forcing both vehicles into the air and onto their sides. The leading coach struck a heavy signal gantry, causing it to collapse, landing away from the coaches. The underframe of the third coach was slightly bent. The steam locomotive derailed and the front end and smokebox were damaged but the leading coach was buffer locked with the tender, although some vans towards the rear of the sleeper train did suffer some damage by derailing and bent buffers.

The only fatalities occurred in the London Bridge train. The motorman and three passengers were killed at the scene; the fourth passenger died later in hospital. A total of 40 people sustained injuries in the incident.

The enquiry noted that there was heavy rain in the area leading up to the accident although at the time of the incident this was reduced to a light drizzle as reported by many members of staff.

Driver Wembridge was acquitted of manslaughter at Sussex Assizes in December 1958.
