= Cooden Beach railway station =

Railway station in East Sussex, England

Cooden Beach
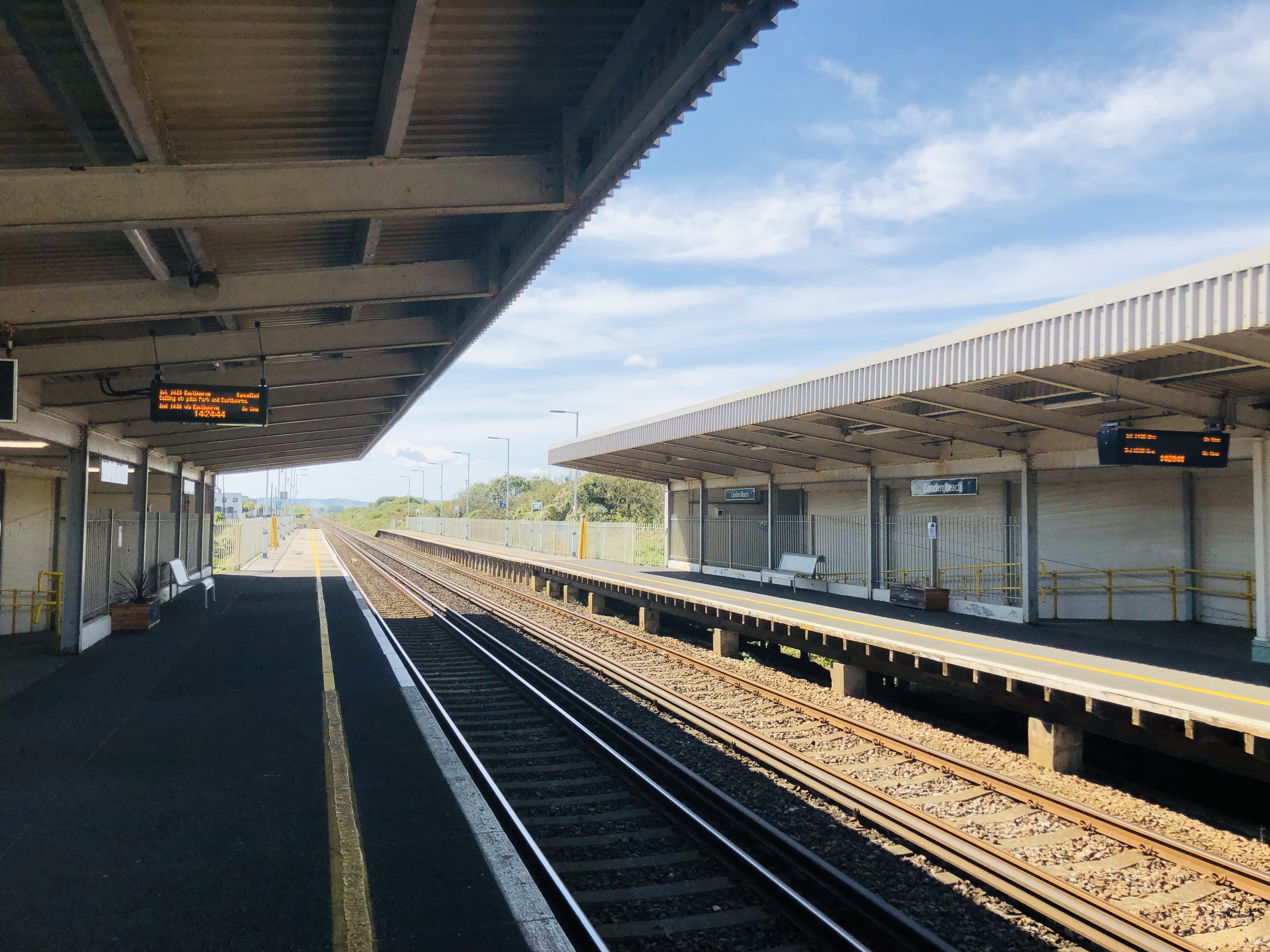
- The platforms at Cooden Beach station, looking west

General information
- Location: Cooden Beach, Bexhill-on-Sea, Rother, East Sussex; England
- Coordinates: 50.833°N 0.427°E
- Grid reference: TQ709065
- Managed by: Southern
- Platforms: 2

Other information
- Station code: COB
- Classification: DfT category E

History
- Original company: London, Brighton and South Coast Railway
- Pre-grouping: London, Brighton and South Coast Railway
- Post-grouping: Southern Railway

Key dates
- 11 September 1905: Opened as Cooden Golf Halt
- by 1922: Renamed Cooden Halt
- 7 July 1935: Renamed Cooden Beach

Passengers
- 2020/21: ▼30,732
- 2021/22: ▲85,266
- 2022/23: ▲97,424
- 2023/24: ▲0.110 million
- 2024/25: ▲0.131 million
Location
Notes
- Passenger statistics from the Office of Rail and Road

Cooden Beach serves Cooden at the western end of Bexhill in East Sussex. It is on the East Coastway Line, and train services are provided by Southern.

== The station ==
The station was first opened on 11 September 1905 as Cooden Golf Halt to serve a growing area of new, mainly high quality, housing located close to the beach (hence its later name). By 1922, the name had been simplified to Cooden Halt. With the growing housing development of the 1930s and the electrification of the line a new enlarged station was built adopting its present name of Cooden Beach on 7 July 1935. The station building is at street level and a subway leads to the platforms with their wooden shelters. The shop next to the ticket office (now combined) has been a sporting goods store and a carpet store.

In the latter half of 2005 and early 2006, Cooden Beach station underwent a minor refurbishment programme to bring the station in line with Southern's image (the company's dark green colour scheme was implemented). The improvements included new double glazing on the subways leading to the platforms and opening up the waiting rooms, which had been closed for at least a decade. The last major refurbishment, by Connex, opened up the old ticket office and shop and turned it into a Costcutter supermarket but a whole station refurbishment was never completed.

The station had a ticket office since its change from a halt, as well as an adjoining shop; however since the latter days of British Rail and early Connex times, the station was unstaffed and a single ticket machine and Permit to travel dispenser were the only station furniture. The introduction of the mini-market seems to have boosted visits to the station and trains now run more frequently. Although in 2008 the mini market was sold and a new ticket office was built.

Cooden Beach is a penalty fare station with most trains operating Southern's strict Penalty Fares policy.

== Services ==
All services at Cooden Beach are operated by Southern using Class 171 DMUs and Class 377 EMUs.

The typical off-peak service in trains per hour is:

- 1 tph to London Victoria via Gatwick Airport
- 1 tph to Eastbourne
- 1 tph to Ore
- 1 tph to Ashford International

During the peak hours, a number of additional services between Brighton, Hastings and Ore also call at the station.

Preceding station	National Rail	Following station
Normans Bay	Southern East Coastway Line	Collington
Pevensey & Westham	Southern East Coastway Line	Collington
