= Lewes derailment =

2026 rail crash in East Sussex, England

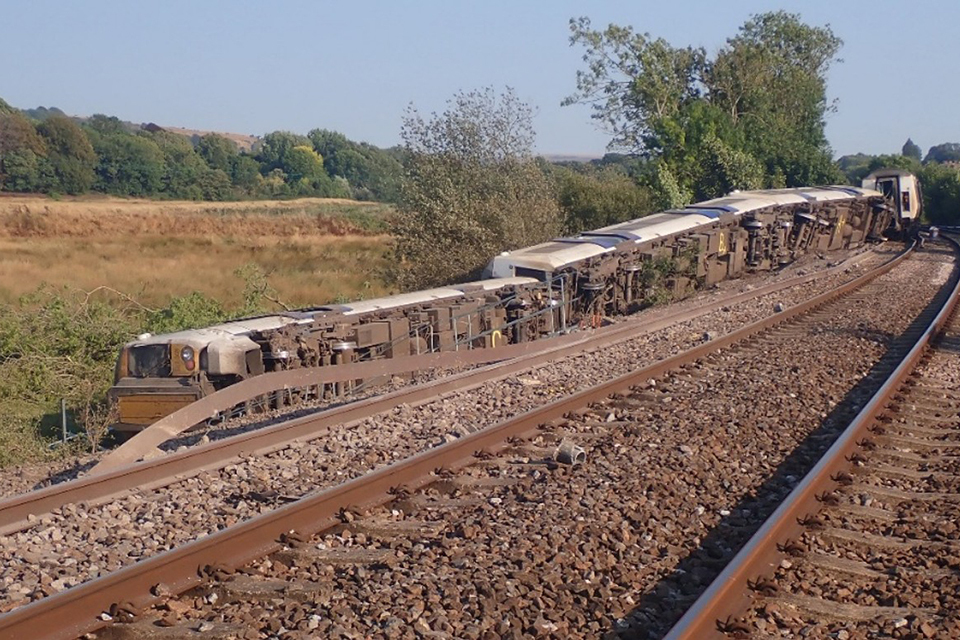
- The derailed train, showing the rear three carriages off the track
- Approximate location of derailment (map data)

Details
- Date: 13 August 2026; 15:54 BST
- Location: Lewes, East Sussex, England
- Coordinates: 50.8843°N 0.0012°W; Grid Reference TQ 406 113
- Line: East Coastway line
- Operator: Greater Thameslink Railway (under Southern brand)
- Service: 1F34, 14:24 London Victoria to Eastbourne
- Incident type: Derailment
- Cause: Under investigation

Statistics
- Trains: 1
- Vehicles: 8 - British Rail Class 387 units 387 172 and 387 304
- Passengers: ~150
- Crew: 2
- Injured: 30 (2 serious)
Lewes derailment

At 15:54 BST on 13 August 2026, a Southern service train, operated by Greater Thameslink Railway, derailed near Lewes railway station in East Sussex. Three carriages of the train, which was en route to Eastbourne from London Victoria, left the tracks, turned onto their sides and slid part-way down the embankment. Thirty people were injured, two of these seriously.

== Derailment ==
Shortly before 15:54 (BST) on 13 August 2026, the 14:24 train from London Victoria to Eastbourne, reporting number 1F34, derailed between Cooksbridge and Lewes, East Sussex, just north of Lewes Tunnel. The rear three carriages of the eight-carriage train (formed of two four-carriage units coupled together) turned on their sides, and slid part-way down the embankment. The train was formed of Class 387 Electrostar multiple units 387 172 (leading) and 387 304 (trailing). It was carrying about 150 passengers, with 110 passengers in the rear four carriages. It was travelling at around 65 miles per hour (105 km/h) when the derailment occurred.

A passenger reported that people were trapped in the carriages after the train came to rest on its side. Some passengers managed to escape, but many waited in hot conditions while firefighters equipped with ladders worked to free them.

The South East Coast Ambulance Service sent more than twenty ambulances, with three air ambulances also attending the scene. East Sussex Fire and Rescue Service sent ten fire engines and a command support unit to the scene. Thirty people were injured in total, with two people sustaining serious injuries and a further 18 people sustaining less serious injuries that required hospitalisation. The two seriously injured people were taken to the Royal Sussex County Hospital in Brighton. Those not requiring hospital treatment were taken to a local community centre. Eighteen people had been discharged from hospital by 14 August, leaving only the two severely injured still in hospital. The train's onboard supervisor was praised by the RMT for his actions in the immediate aftermath of the accident.

In the hours after the derailment, ITV Meridian asserted that the cause is suspected to be a track defect, but that no cause had been officially confirmed. It was reported by The Telegraph that the hot weather, combined with the metal design not being adequately prepared to withstand high temperatures, contributed to the derailment. A safety inspection of the track had been carried out the previous day. Following the accident, RAIB has received several reports of rough riding at the location of the derailment from passengers on other trains. Lewes MP James MacCleary also said that he had had reports of rough riding. He stated that he had raised the issue with Southern on "more than one occasion recently". Drivers were said to have "report fatigue" over the issue.

== Aftermath ==
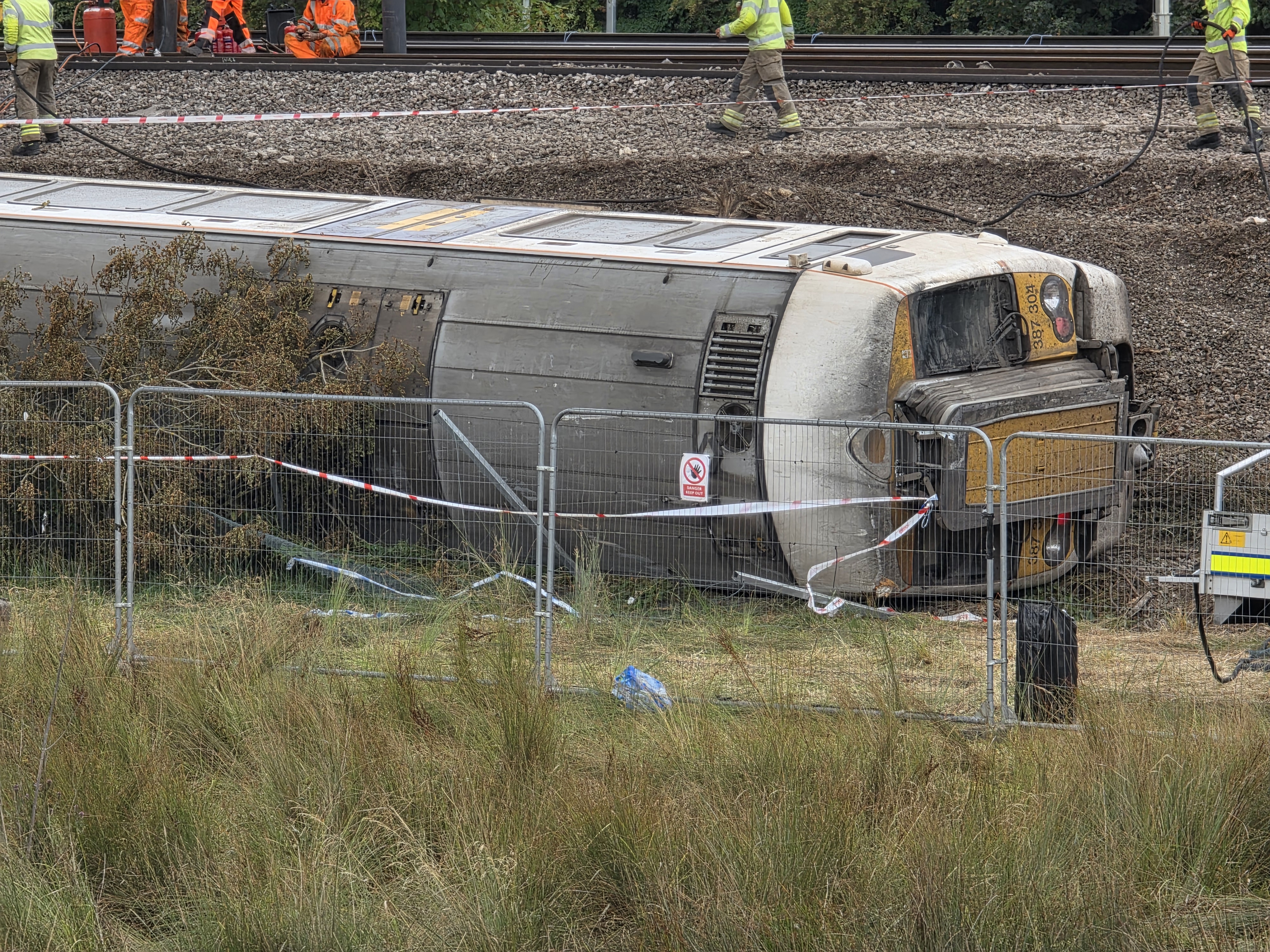
The derailed 387 304, seen on 18 August.

All trains were cancelled between Lewes and Brighton, Eastbourne, Haywards Heath and Seaford. Southern Railway issued a "do not travel" notice for the area for the rest of the day, and said that disruption was expected to continue "until further notice". A bus replacement service was put in place between Lewes and Haywards Heath. Alternative arrangements were made to transport attendees of two large events, Eastbourne Airbourne airshow and the Opera at Glyndebourne, who were left stranded by the line closure.

The East Coastway line between Polegate and Eastbourne was closed for a track inspection on the evening of 14 August. Having completed their on-site investigation, the RAIB handed the site back to Network Rail on 15 August. Network Rail stated that plans were being made for the recovery of the derailed train. The line via Cooksbridge was not expected to reopen for another 10 days, due to the accident site being next to a Site of Special Scientific Interest which makes the recovery of the three carriages more challenging.

Two rail-mounted cranes were used to remove the derailed carriages. The carriages that were not derailed were removed from the site by rail on 20 August. One of the three derailed carriages was removed from the site that day. The other two carriages were removed from the site on 21 August. The line reopened on 1 September. In November, Network Rail said the cost of repairs following the derailment was expected to be £5.4 million.

== Investigation ==
The RAIB deployed a team of inspectors and support staff to the scene, with the British Transport Police providing support. On 19 August, the RAIB announced that a full investigation into the accident would be carried out. The investigation will seek to identify the sequence of events which led to the accident, including:

- the exact mechanism by which train 1F34 derailed
- the status of the track at this location and how it was inspected and maintained
- the condition of the embankment, including the presence of any coincident risk factors (such as sustained hot weather, nearby structures, and vegetation), and how it was inspected and maintained
- the weather conditions in the area on the day of the accident, and in the weeks and months preceding it
- the effectiveness of any mitigation measures intended to address the risks of operating trains in hot weather
- the condition of train 1F34 and the crashworthiness performance of the rear three vehicles of the train during the derailment
- the emergency response to the accident
- any relevant underlying factors, including any actions taken in response to previous relevant safety recommendations.

On 19 August 2026, initial RAIB findings noted that CCTV images from preceding services showed that prior to the accident, a "track geometry irregularity" existed on the immediate approach to the point of derailment. The RAIB highlighted that the accident occurred "during a sustained period of hot and dry weather", with temperatures of up to 33 °C (91 °F).
