= Plumpton railway station =

Railway station in East Sussex, England

Plumpton
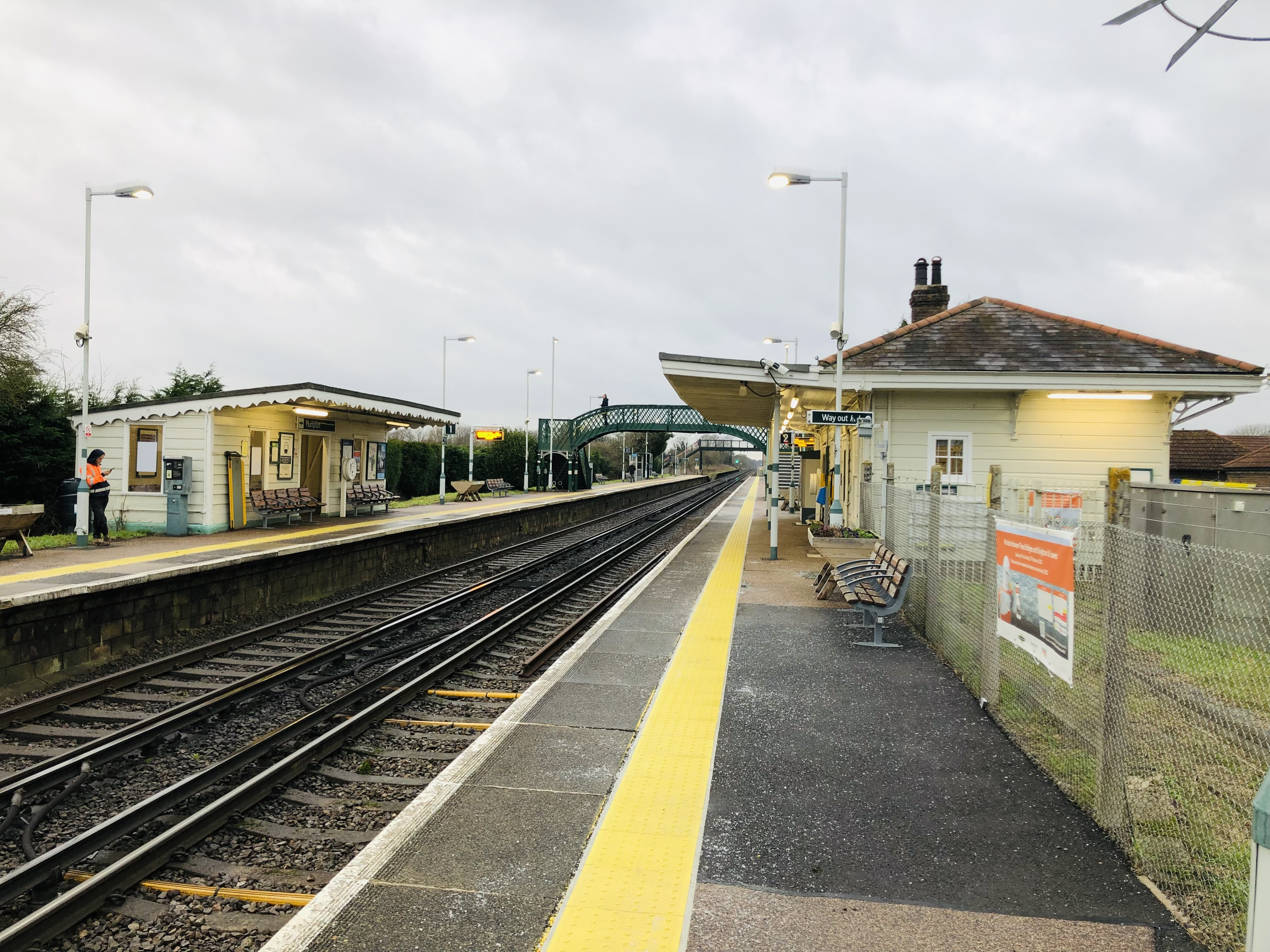
- The platforms at Plumpton, looking northwest

General information
- Location: Plumpton Green, Lewes District, East Sussex; England
- Coordinates: 50.929°N 0.060°W
- Grid reference: TQ364161
- Managed by: Southern
- Platforms: 2

Other information
- Station code: PMP
- Classification: DfT category E

History
- Original company: London, Brighton and South Coast Railway
- Pre-grouping: London, Brighton and South Coast Railway
- Post-grouping: Southern Railway

Key dates
- June 1863: Station opened

Passengers
- 2020/21: ▼26,358
- 2021/22: ▲76,140
- 2022/23: ▲91,996
- 2023/24: ▲0.101 million
- 2024/25: ▲0.105 million
Location
Notes
- Passenger statistics from the Office of Rail and Road

Plumpton railway station serves the village of Plumpton in East Sussex, England. It is 44 miles 42 chains (71.7 km) from London Bridge via Redhill.

Train services are provided by Southern. The station neighbours Plumpton Racecourse, which had its own platform at the end of the village station.

== History ==
Plumpton lies on the London, Brighton and South Coast Railway "cut-off" line between Keymer Junction, near Wivelsfield on the Brighton Main Line, and Lewes. The erstwhile Brighton, Lewes and Hastings Railway were authorised to build the line in 1845; the LBSCR purchased it and opened the link on 1 October 1847. However, there was no immediate demand for services and the station did not open until June 1863.

The road crossing was established in 1849 and was hand operated until the establishment of the signal box in 1891. That signal box, now defunct (after being reduced to a crossing box under the supervision of Three Bridges PSB) after the crossing was given obstacle detection systems. It still remains and is a Grade II Listed Building.

== Crossing Closure Controversy ==
Network Rail closed the level crossing in September 2015 so that the wooden, wheel worked gates (the last in East Sussex) on the crossing could be replaced. However, Lewes District Council rejected the plans to replace the gates as it would have caused "substantial harm to the significance of the signal box", and there were protests from villagers. Network Rail said that they could not open the crossing as the work was not completed. This effectively split the village in two, with some motorists having to take a six or seven mile detour. However the upgrade took place and the level crossing was reopened in February 2016.

== Services ==
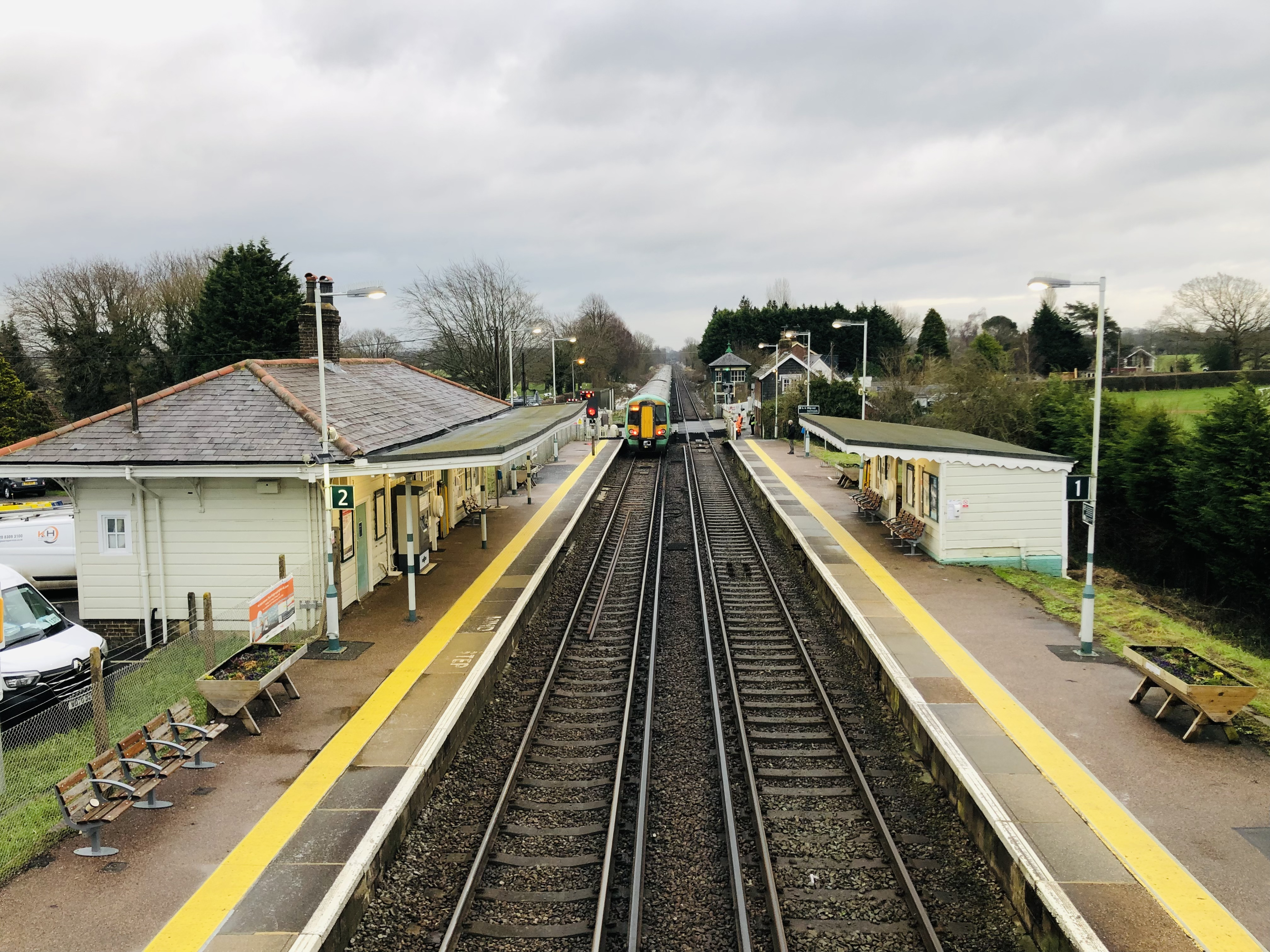
A Southern Class 377 set passes through Cooksbridge bound for Eastbourne; the station's old signal box can be seen in the background.

All services at Plumpton are operated by Southern using Class 377 EMUs.

The typical off-peak service in trains per hour is:

- 1 tph to London Victoria via Gatwick Airport
- 1 tph to Ore via Eastbourne and Hastings

During the peak hours, the station is served by an additional hourly service between London Victoria and Eastbourne, increasing the service to 2tph in each direction.

Preceding station	National Rail	Following station
Wivelsfield	Southern East Coastway Line	Cooksbridge or Lewes
