= Collington railway station =

Railway station in East Sussex, England

Coordinates: 50.839°N 0.458°E

Collington
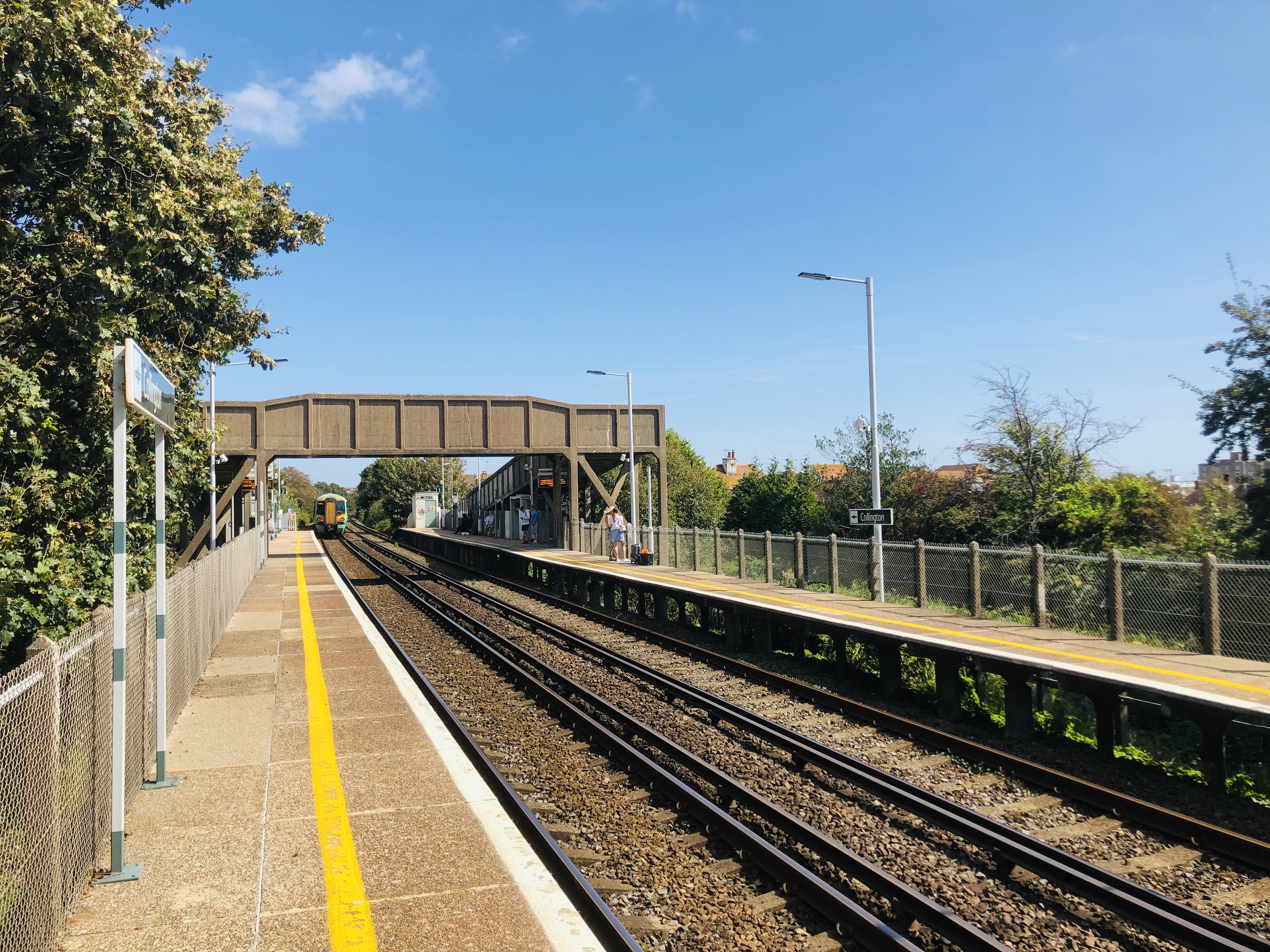
- The platforms at Collington station, looking east

General information
- Location: Bexhill-on-Sea, Rother; England
- Grid reference: TQ730072
- Managed by: Southern
- Platforms: 2

Other information
- Station code: CLL
- Classification: DfT category F1

Key dates
- 11 September 1905: Opened (Collington Wood Halt)
- 1 September 1906: Closed
- 1 June 1911: Reopened and renamed (West Bexhill Halt)
- December 1929: Renamed (Collington Halt)
- 5 May 1969: Renamed (Collington)

Passengers
- 2020/21: ▼47,356
- 2021/22: ▲0.115 million
- 2022/23: ▲0.132 million
- 2023/24: ▲0.157 million
- 2024/25: ▲0.182 million
Location
Notes
- Passenger statistics from the Office of Rail and Road

Collington railway station serves Collington, at the western end of Bexhill in East Sussex. It is on the East Coastway Line, and train services are provided by Southern.

The station has had several name changes: it was opened as Collington Wood Halt on 11 September 1905; closed a year later, it reopened as West Bexhill Halt, and then became Collington Halt in 1929; the Halt was dropped in 1969.

The station has two platforms linked by a footbridge. There are ticket machines on both platforms which have recently replaced the Permit to Travel machines. There are also train information displays on both sides of the station, as well as an information box with an automated announcer providing departure announcements.

The station's sponsorship has recently been acquired by Hastings Direct who now advertise below the station's nameplate.

== Services ==
All services at Collington are operated by Southern using Class 171 DMUs and Class 377 EMUs.

The typical off-peak service in trains per hour is:

- 1 tph to London Victoria via Gatwick Airport
- 1 tph to Eastbourne
- 1 tph to Ore
- 1 tph to Ashford International

During the peak hours, a number of additional services between Brighton, Hastings and Ore also call at the station.

Preceding station	National Rail	Following station
Cooden Beach	Southern East Coastway Line	Bexhill
