= Pevensey Bay railway station =

Railway station in East Sussex, England

Pevensey Bay
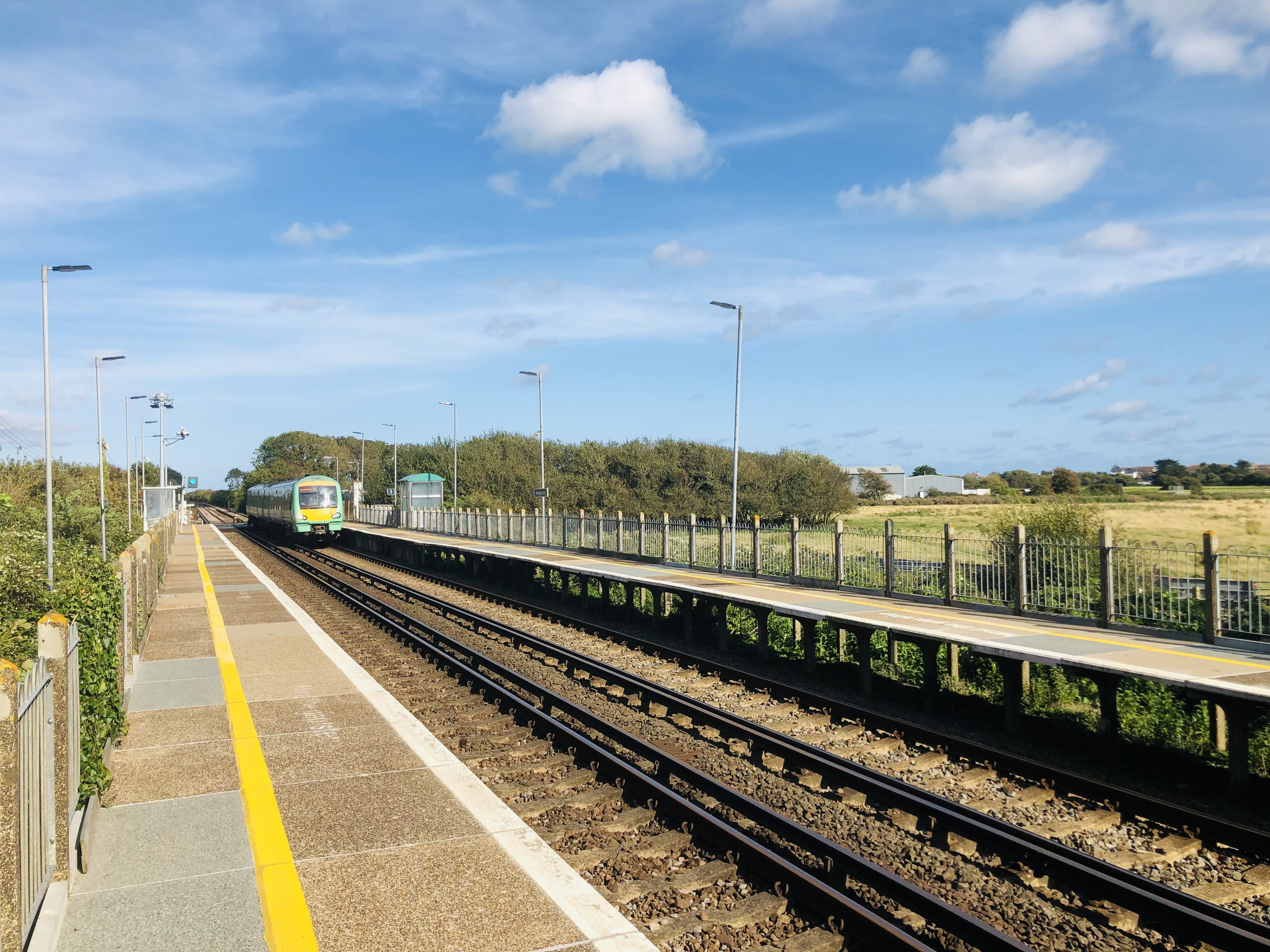
- The platforms, looking east

General information
- Location: Pevensey, Wealden; England
- Coordinates: 50.8176°N 0.3425°E
- Grid reference: TQ651046
- Manager: Southern
- Platforms: 2

Other information
- Station code: PEB
- Classification: DfT category F2

History
- Original company: London, Brighton and South Coast Railway
- Pre-grouping: London, Brighton and South Coast Railway
- Post-grouping: Southern Railway

Key dates
- 11 September 1905: Opened as Pevensey Bay Halt
- 5 May 1969: Renamed Pevensey Bay

Passengers
- 2021/22: ▲6,700
- 2022/23: ▼5,192
- 2023/24: ▲5,828
- 2024/25: ▲5,848
- 2025/26: ▼5,390
Location
Notes
- Passenger statistics from the Office of Rail and Road

Pevensey Bay railway station serves Pevensey Bay in East Sussex, England. It is on the East Coastway Line, and train services are provided by Southern.

It was opened by the London, Brighton and South Coast Railway on 11 September 1905, and was originally named Pevensey Bay Halt. It was renamed Pevensey Bay on 5 May 1969.

The station was the setting for an episode of The Goon Show called 'The Pevensey Bay Disaster' which was first broadcast in 1956.

== Services ==
All services at Pevensey Bay are operated by Southern using Class 377 EMUs.

The station is served by a limited service which operates during the peak hours on weekdays only. The station is served by four trains per day to Brighton and five trains per day to Hastings, four of which continue to Ore. There are no weekend services.

Preceding station	National Rail	Following station
Pevensey & Westham	Southern East Coastway Line Monday-Friday only	Normans Bay
