= Bexhill railway station =

Railway station in East Sussex, England

Coordinates: 50.841°N 0.477°E

Bexhill
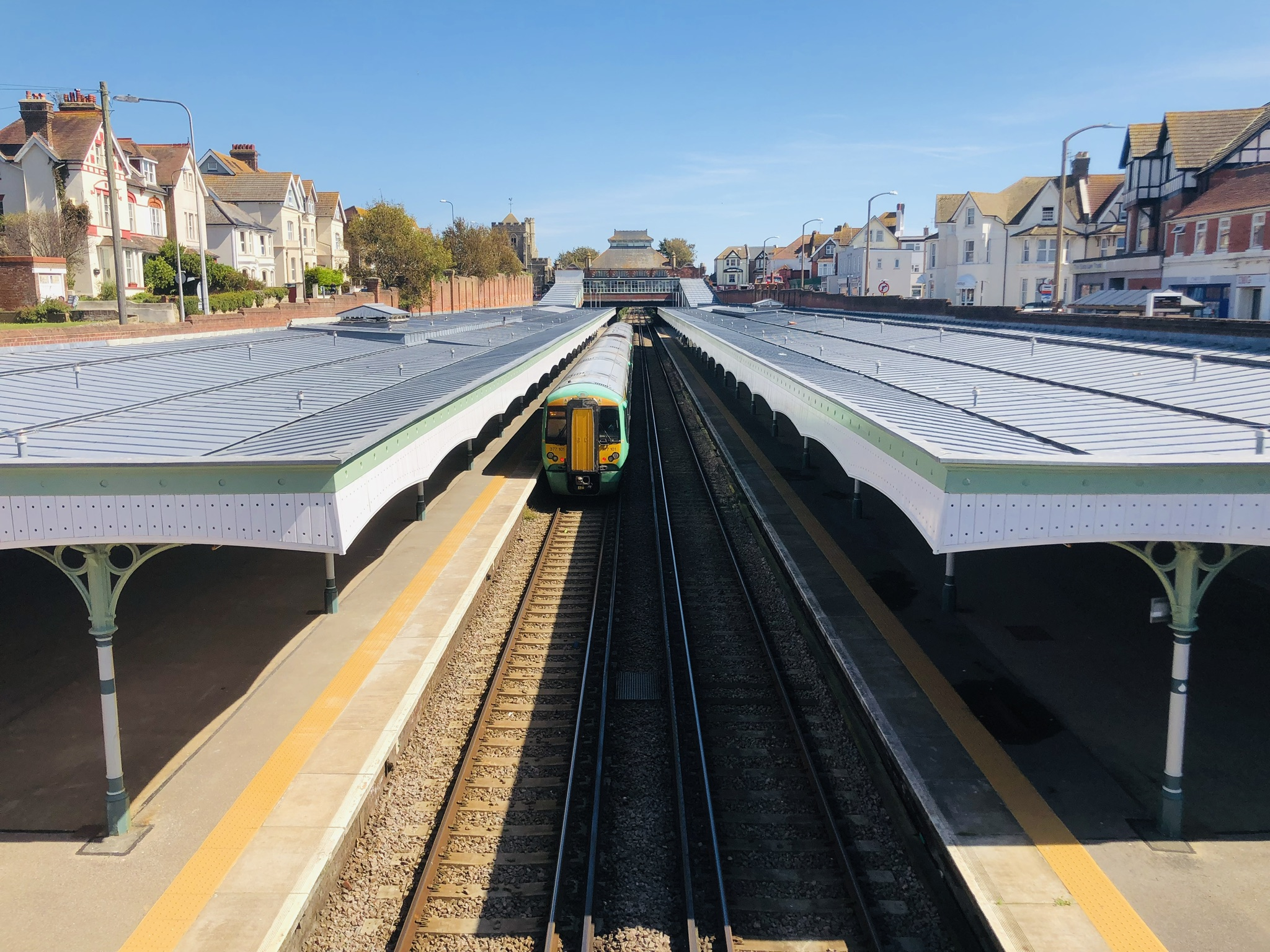
- 377 101 at Bexhill station, looking east

General information
- Location: Bexhill-on-Sea, Rother; England
- Grid reference: TQ743075
- Manager: Southern
- Platforms: 2

Other information
- Station code: BEX
- Classification: DfT category E

Key dates
- 27 June 1846: opened as Bexhill
- 1902: resited
- 9 July 1923: renamed Bexhill Central
- ?: renamed Bexhill

Passengers
- 2020/21: ▼0.582 million
- 2021/22: ▲1.298 million
- 2022/23: ▲1.400 million
- 2023/24: ▼1.384 million
- 2024/25: ▲1.489 million
Location
Notes
- Passenger statistics from the Office of Rail and Road

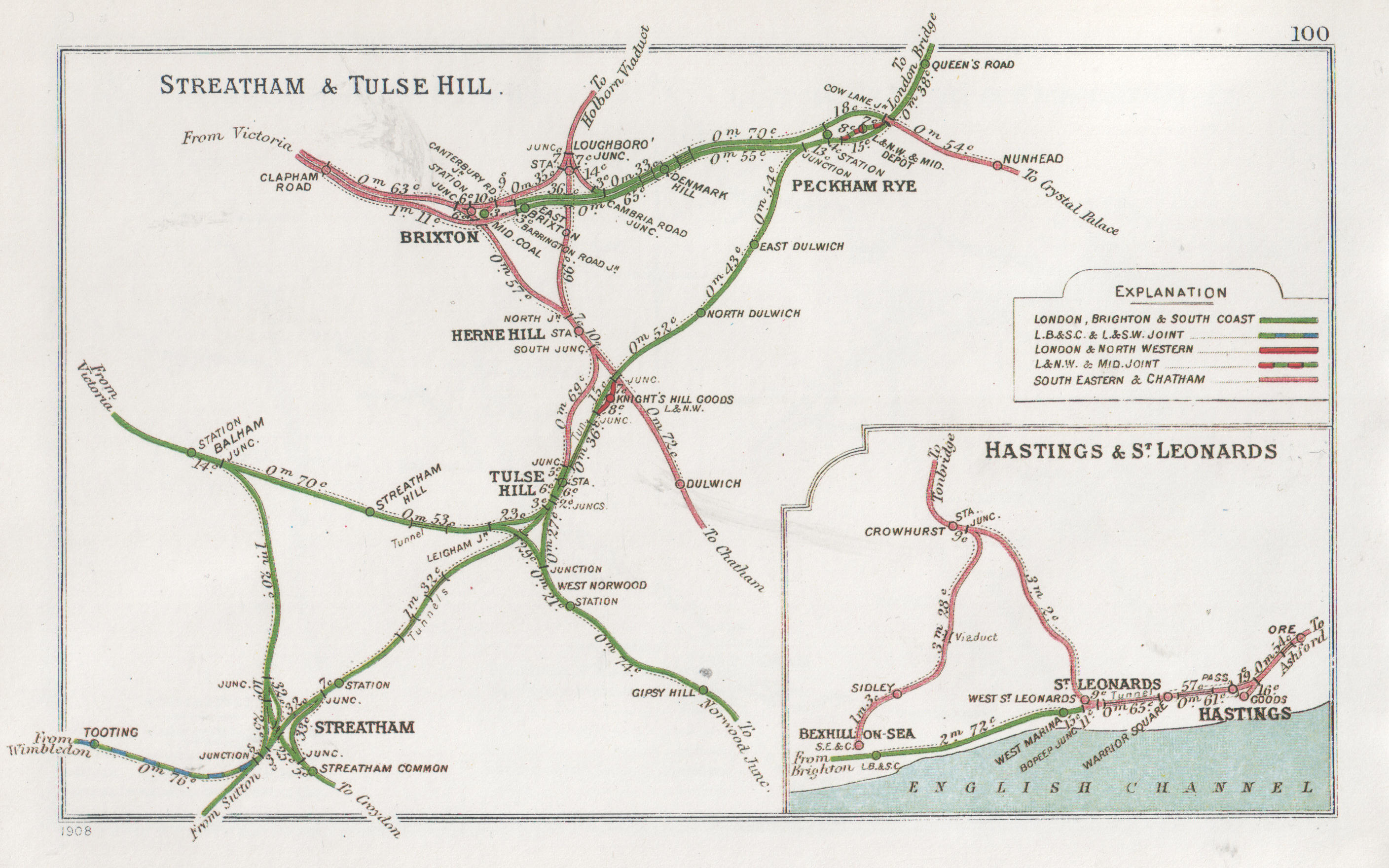
A 1908 Railway Clearing House map of lines around Bexhill.

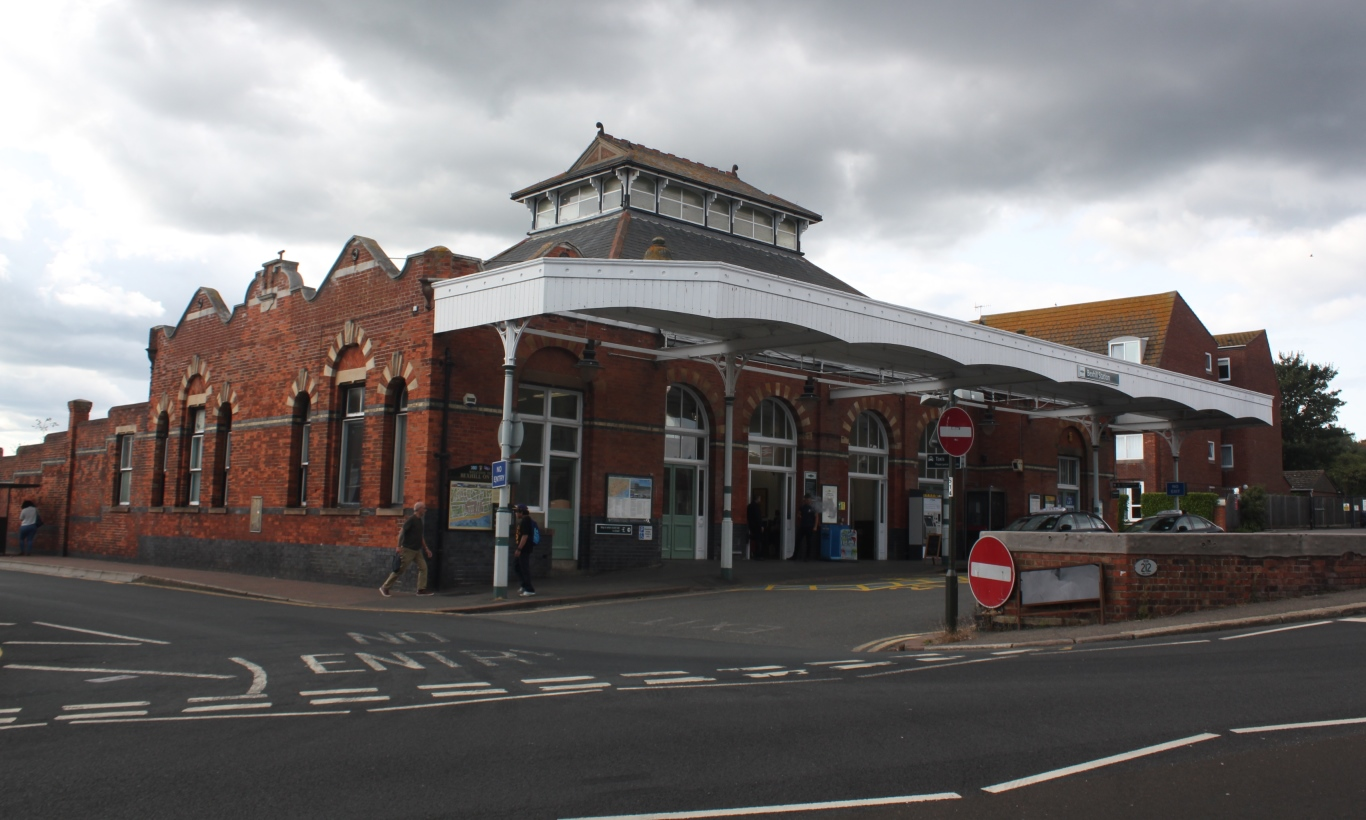
The station building

Bexhill railway station serves Bexhill-on-Sea in East Sussex, England. It is on the East Coastway Line, and train services are provided by Southern.

== History ==
The first station to serve the town opened in 1846 was on the up and down sides across the top of Station Square, now Devonshire Square. The present station was opened in June 1902 and replaced the previous station. Platforms of the new station overlapped the old station and therefore there were exceptionally long platforms, approximately 960 yards (878 m). The station was known as Bexhill Central after July 1923, when the Southern Railway was formed. This was because the former SECR establishment in Terminus Road took was also Bexhill. Bexhill Central reverted to Bexhill sometime after the SECR establishment closed in June 1964.

== Description ==
The station is a grade II listed building, and a restoration project to the platform canopies and ticket office area was completed in the summer of 2008.

The station is accredited as part of the Department for Transport's Secure Stations scheme, with a digital CCTV system in place. It is staffed during the daytime but not late in the evenings.

The station has ticket barrier access only, prior to this the station was often unstaffed.

== Services ==
All services at Bexhill are operated by Southern using Class 377 EMUs and Class 171 DMUs.

The typical off-peak service in trains per hour is:

- 1 tph to London Victoria via Gatwick Airport
- 1 tph to Brighton (semi-fast)
- 1 tph to Eastbourne (stopping)
- 2 tph to Ore
- 1 tph to Ashford International

Additional services call at the station during the peak hours.

Preceding station	National Rail	Following station
Collington	Southern East Coastway Line	St Leonards Warrior Square
