= East Coastway line =

Railway line in Sussex, England

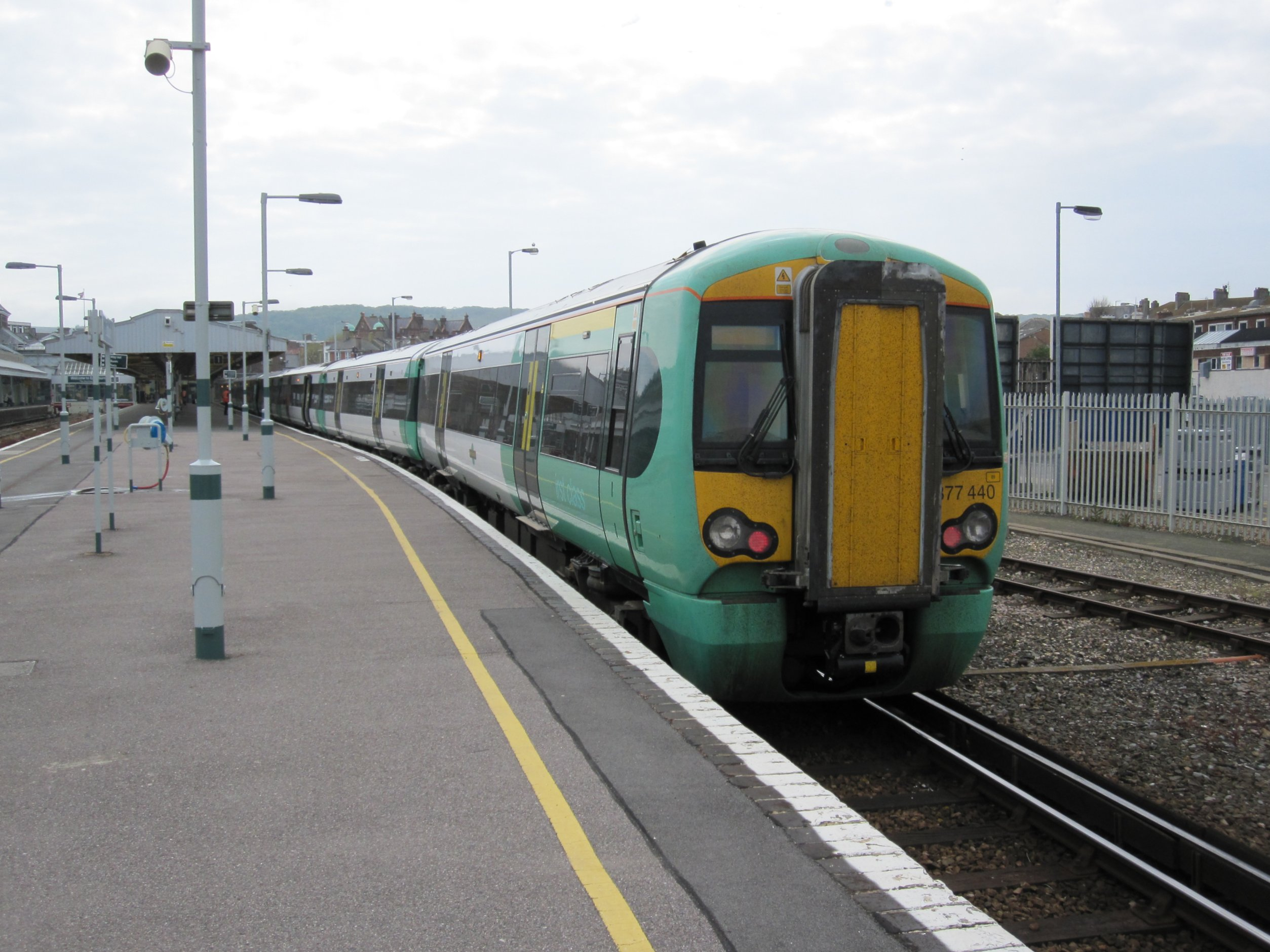
- A Southern Class 377 stands at Eastbourne in 2010

Overview
- Status: Operational
- Owner: Network Rail
- Locale: East Sussex, South East England
- Termini: Brighton, Wivelsfield; Hastings
- Stations: 17

Service
- Type: Heavy rail
- System: National Rail
- Operator(s): Southern; Southeastern
- Depot(s): Brighton – Lovers Walk; Eastbourne; St Leonards
- Rolling stock: Class 171 "Turbostar"; Class 387 "Electrostar" Class 377 "Electrostar"; Class 375 "Electrostar"

History
- Opened: 1846

Technical
- Line length: 47 mi (75.63 km)
- Number of tracks: 2
- Track gauge: 4 ft 8 1/2 in (1,435 mm) standard gauge
- Electrification: 750 V DC Third rail
- Operating speed: 90 mph (145 km/h) maximum
Route map
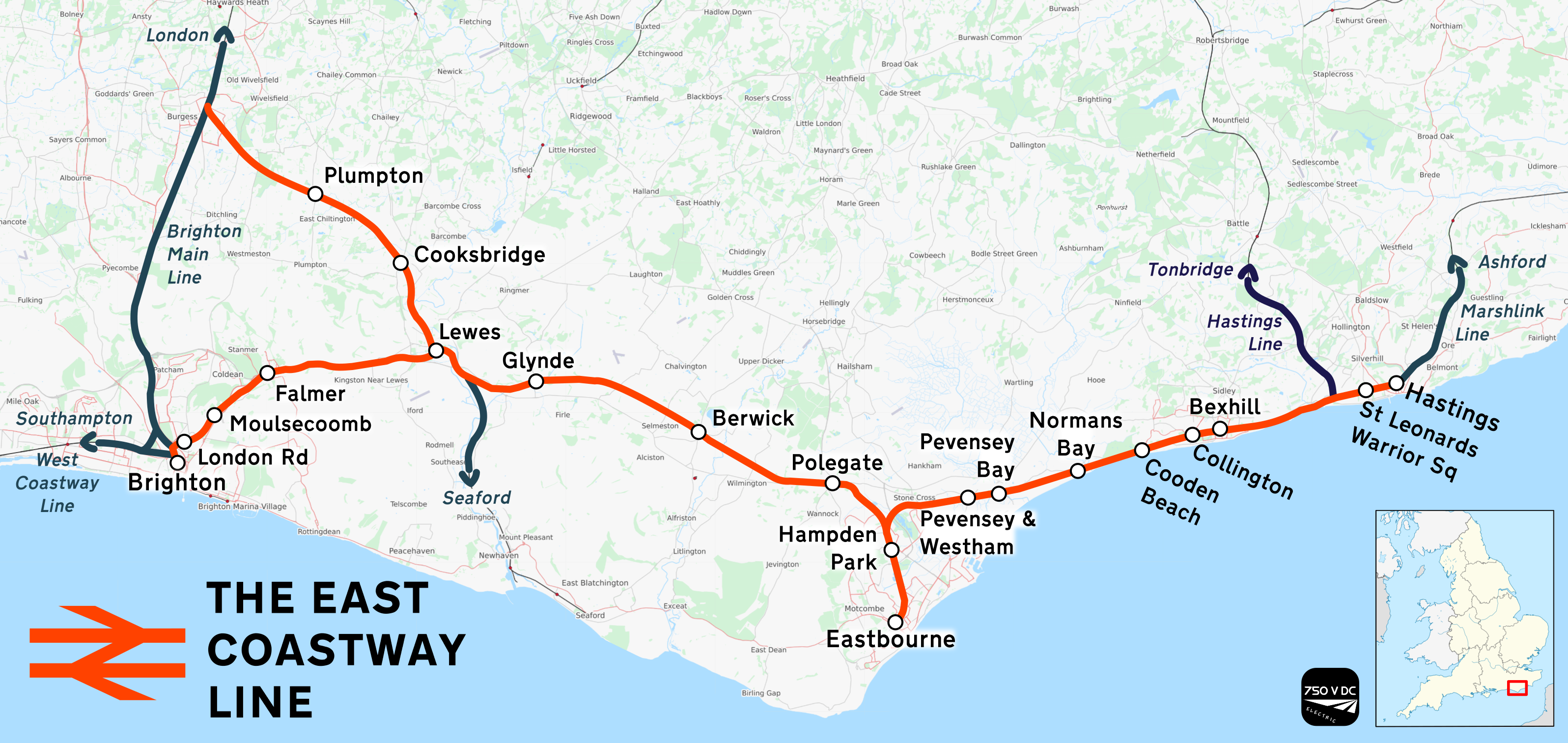
(Click to expand)

The East Coastway line is a railway line along the south coast of Sussex to the east of Brighton, England. Trains to the west of Brighton operate on the West Coastway line. Together with the West Coastway and the Marshlink line to the east, the line forms part of a continuous route from Havant to Ashford. The Brighton Main Line route to Eastbourne and Hastings, via Plumpton and Cooksbridge, shares the East Coastway line east of Lewes station.

The train operating company Southern refers to the routes on this line as "East Coastway" or "Coastway East". The trains running under the East Coastway name serve stations between Brighton, Lewes, Eastbourne, Hastings, Ore and Ashford, together with the branch line to Seaford. A closed branch to Kemptown, Brighton diverged just east of London Road Station.

== Route ==
=== Brighton to Lewes (East Branch) ===
Trains travelling from Brighton via the East Coastway line mainly use the eastern platforms. They follow the Brighton Main Line and turn east over the 28-arch London Road viaduct, which offers views of the housing in Preston and Withdean to the north, and the city to the south. Then, they enter a cutting where London Road (Brighton) is situated. As the train continues, it climbs on a 1 in 258 gradient, passing through the first tunnel, the Ditchling Road Tunnel, which is 63 yards (58m) in length. The junction situated just after the tunnel for a branch line to Kemp Town was closed in 1971. The train passes Moulsecoomb, which was opened on 12 May 1980, and crosses Hodshrove Viaduct. The gradient starts to increase to 1 in 99, reaching Falmer on a 1 in 93 gradient, and then levels out in the 490 yards (441m) long Falmer Tunnel. Finally, the route descends towards Lewes through the South Downs, along a 1 in 88 gradient for around 4 miles, passing through the former site of Lewes Priory and then leveling out at Lewes.

=== Keymer Junction to Lewes ===
The train route leaves the Brighton Main Line at Keymer Junction, which is located just south of Wivelsfield. Then, it heads south, passing through Burgess Hill's northern edge while it gently descends towards Plumpton. During this section of the line, the speed reaches 90 mph while still descending towards Cooksbridge. As the train slows down to 70 mph, it passes Hamsey level crossing before turning south to run along the River Ouse and entering the 395 yards (361m) long Lewes Tunnel. Finally, the train reaches Lewes.

=== Lewes to Eastbourne ===
Lewes once served as a junction for other routes, including two branch lines to the north. One led to Eridge via Uckfield, while the other went to East Grinstead and beyond. Both routes departed from Lewes via the Wealden Line and split at Culver Junction. The main line and the east branch converge upon leaving Lewes and then sweep around a long curve over the River Ouse and under the A27 road to reach Southerham Junction for the Newhaven & Seaford branch. There were interchange sidings to the north of the line for the then nearby cement works.

A mile further, the route passes under the A27 road again at the base of Mount Caburn, then passes through Glynde. Glynde once had interchange sidings for two industrial branch lines: one leading to a clay pit, and the other to a chalk pit. The line follows a near-straight route to Berwick, then heads on a slightly undulating gradient over the River Cuckmere and then downhill towards the current Polegate station. The previous station, 330 yards west, was once a busy junction station with the former branch line to Eridge via Hailsham (Cuckoo Line), which closed in 1968. Leaving the station, there once was a junction for the spur line then continued east towards Hastings, which allowed trains to bypass the Branch; this has now been closed, and all trains run into Eastbourne line and reverse at the terminus to continue their journey. After a sharp bend, the route follows a slight downhill gradient to Willingdon Junction, where the route to and from Hastings now runs. Shortly after is Hampden Park, then over the flat Willingdon Levels to Eastbourne, a terminus station.

=== Eastbourne to St Leonards ===
From Eastbourne, the route is reversed as it passes through Hampden Park and reaches Willingdon Junction. Here, the route turns towards the former Stone Cross Junction, from where the route coming from Polegate used to join. Shortly after the site of Stone Cross Halt, which was opened in 1905 and closed in 1935, the route has a slight gradient towards Pevensey and Westham. The line now passes Pevensey Castle and crosses the Pevensey Levels, serving the Pevensey Bay, which is only served during peak times. The line then passes the Beachlands estate on the south and a caravan site before reaching Normans Bay, originally opened as a halt and still maintains an hourly service. Continuing along the Pevensey Levels, the line passes close to the beach before heading inland at Cooden Beach and Collington, before reaching Bexhill. The route next runs through a cutting to the site of Galley Hill sidings and then runs along the coast past Bulverhythe and the depots of the Hastings Diesels and the Southeastern before going through the site of St Leonards (West Marina) that was closed in 1967. The East Coastway line ends shortly after at Bo-Peep Junction where the Hastings Line from Tonbridge continues through Bo-Peep Tunnel to St Leonards (Warrior Square) and through Hastings Tunnel to Hastings. Some trains from London and Brighton continue beyond Hastings to Ore, where there is a turnaround siding, the old depot having been closed and redeveloped. This is the end of the East Coastway route, while the line heading east to Ashford is known as the Marshlink line.

== History ==
=== Main line ===
The Brighton, Lewes and Hastings Railway (BLHR) was established on 7 February 1844, and was granted parliamentary approval to construct a line between Brighton and Lewes by the Brighton, Lewes and Hastings Railway Act 1844 (7 & 8 Vict. c. xci) on 29 July 1844. The work was started by September, engineered by John Urpeth Rastrick. The route crossed a valley with the London Road viaduct and then ran through the South Downs to Falmer before descending to Lewes, with a station located at Falmer. This section was opened on 8 June 1846. On 27 June that year, a single-line extension was opened to just outside Hastings at Bulverhythe, with an intermediate station at Polegate to serve the nearby towns of Hailsham and South Bourne, the latter now part of Eastbourne. This section was later doubled in January 1849.

On 27 July 1846 the BLHR merged with other railways to form the London, Brighton and South Coast Railway (LB&SCR). In November 1846, the bridge over the River Asten was completed and Bulverhythe Temporary Station was replaced by a permanent station named Hastings & St Leonards, later renamed to St Leonards West Marina.

For almost a year, all services from London travelled via Brighton until a spur off the Brighton Main Line was constructed from Keymer Junction to Lewes and opened on 2 October 1847.

The first station opened at Lewes was a terminus at Friar's Walk. After the extension to Hastings opened, trains from Brighton visited the station and then reversed out before continuing east. When the line from Keymer Junction opened, a new set of makeshift and unroofed platforms opened near the junction to the station, known as the Pinwell platforms. These eliminated the need for reversing trains but were separate from Friars walk. A new junction station with four platforms was constructed and opened on 1 November 1857, serving trains to Brighton, London, Uckfield, Newhaven, Eastbourne, and Hastings. To accommodate more platforms and reduce the tight curves, the station was rebuilt, realigned, and reopened on 17 June 1889. The original route leading to the freight yards was retained.

Another junction station on the line was at Polegate. On 14 May 1849 two branch lines from Polegate were built, one southwards to Eastbourne and one north to Hailsham. Both had left the station from the east, which meant trains from Eastbourne had to reverse at Polegate. This was changed when the Cuckoo Line from Hailsham to Eridge was extended in 1880, and a new station was built 1/4 mile (400 m) mile east. It had four through platforms and the line to Hailsham was re-routed from the west of the station. This eliminated the need to reverse trains from Eastbourne towards Tunbridge Wells.

The next station on the line towards Eastbourne was Hampden Park, built in 1888 as Willingdon, after the parish of Willingdon. The junction north of this station was called Willingdon Junction, where the route diverges either east or west. A single line spur from Willingdon Junction to Stone Cross Junction was opened on 2 August 1871, forming a triangular junction between Polegate, Pevensey, and Eastbourne and allowing direct trains to operate from Eastbourne to Hastings.

The terminus at Eastbourne was originally a timber building. It was rebuilt in 1866, and the timber was reused to build a house at No. 1 Wharf Road. The second station was redesigned in 1872 and then significantly rebuilt in 1886. At its peak, it had four platforms, a locomotive shed, and an extensive goods yard.

The remaining 1/4 mile (400 m) of line to Hastings was constructed by the South Eastern Railway in 1851 as a part of their line from Ashford to Hastings, but the LB&SCR obtained running powers over it.

=== Kemp Town branch ===
A 1 3/4-mile-long (2.8 km) branch line from east of London Road station to Kemp Town opened on 2 August 1869. It was expensive to build and required a tunnel and a 14 arch viaduct across Lewes Road and Hartington Road. The line was primarily constructed to alleviate the LBSCR's fears of another company approaching Brighton from the east. An intermediate station at Lewes Road opened on 1 September 1873.

The branch temporarily closed to passengers on 1 January 1917. It reopened on 10 August 1919 but closed permanently on 1 January 1933. During the Second World War, the tunnel leading into Kemp Town was used as an air-raid shelter. The line continued to be used for goods traffic until 14 August 1971. The viaduct was demolished in 1976.

=== Crumbles branch ===
This branch, spanning 3-mile (5 km) and constructed in 1862, led to a shingle bank called The Crumbles, which was 3/4-mile-wide (1.2 km); shingle collected here was used as ballast for railway lines by LB&SCR. Ballast trains ran until 1932, when the Southern Railway switched to use granite. Additional branches were later added to the line, including a siding built in 1870 for the Eastbourne Gas Company, which straddled the railway. The gasworks received coal via transport, and in return, produced coke, which was taken away. In 1926, a line was laid for the Eastbourne Corporation Electric Works, which transported coal and supplied fuel to the bus garage, as well as taking scrap metal from the refuse destructor works. The branch ceased steam working in April 1960, after which diesel shunting locomotives took over until the line was closed in early 1967.

=== Motor trains ===
The LB&SCR introduced motor train services between Eastbourne and St Leonards West Marina in 1905. The company provided new unstaffed halts at Stone Cross, Pevensey Bay, Normans Bay, Cooden, Collington, and Glyne Gap. All of them are still open apart from Stone Cross (closed in 1935) and Glyne Gap (closed in 1915).

=== Electrification ===
All the lines, as far as Ore (except for the Kemp Town branch), were electrified using the 750 V DC third rail system by the Southern Railway, which opened in May 1935.

=== World War II ===
Because of its proximity to the East Sussex Coast, the line was targeted several times in bombing raids during World War II. During a daylight air raid on 25 May 1943, a German bomber dropped five bombs that hit the upper goods yard north of Brighton station. Additionally, part of the London Road viaduct was also damaged. The bombs demolished two arches and caused the death of one railway employee. Temporary repairs were quickly made to the structure and the damaged brickwork was fully restored by the end of the year.

In 1941, the locomotive shed at Eastbourne was left virtually roofless after numerous air raids.

During a German air raid in March 1944, the platforms at Eastbourne were severely damaged. The attack ripped up the tracks and brought down the platform canopies. Also, in 1942, railway employees were killed during an ARP exercise.

== Operation ==
=== Services ===
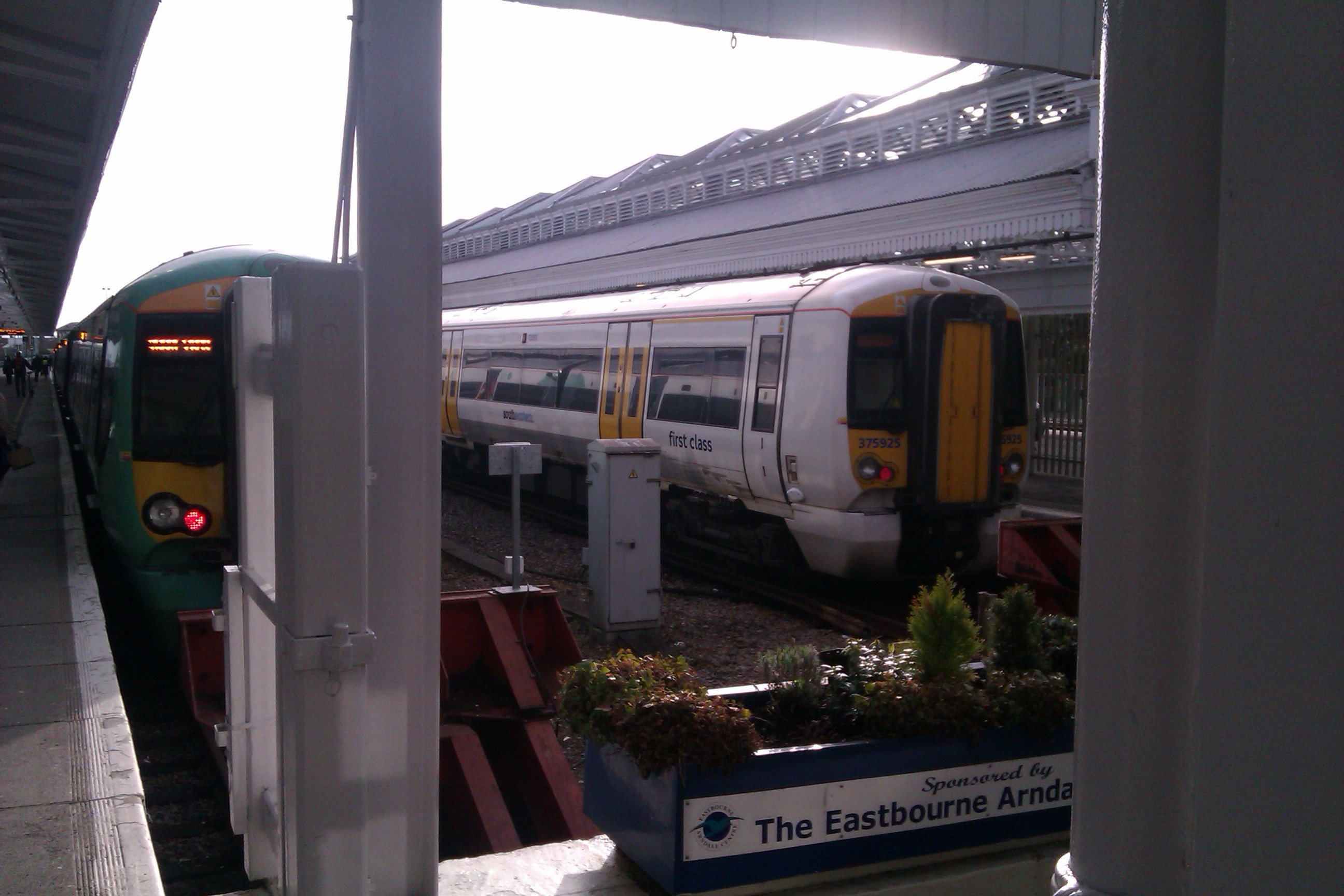
Diverted Southeastern (Govia) service at Eastbourne in April 2012

Passenger services are operated by Southern. Between Hastings and St Leonards West Marina the track is shared with Southeastern using their services on the Hastings Line and also shunting movements to the depot at St Leonards West Marina.

A typical Southern service along the route is:

- Hourly, London Victoria – Eastbourne
- Hourly, London Victoria – Ore via Eastbourne
- Hourly, Eastbourne – Ashford International
- Hourly, Brighton – Eastbourne
- Hourly, Brighton – Ore via Eastbourne
- Half hourly, Brighton – Seaford

In circumstances when the Brighton Main Line has both running lines closed between Preston Park and Keymer Junction, some services between Brighton and London may be diverted via Lewes, with trains having to reverse at the end of the station.

A Southeastern service is typically a half hourly London Charing Cross–Hastings.

=== Signalling ===
==== Pre 2015 ====
The line was originally signalled by a mixture of semaphore signals and colour lights by several signal boxes over the years. Almost every station had a signal box, Lewes even had five signal boxes controlling the area including the goods yard. Polegate had three signal boxes and other signal boxes at Willingdon and Stone Cross junctions and at Pevensey Bay and Cooden Beach There were also crossing boxes at Ripe, between Glynde and Berwick, and at Wilmington, between Berwick and Polegate.

Before 2015, Three Bridges signalling centre controlled the route between Keymer Junction and Plumpton and Brighton to Falmer where Lewes Power Box takes over until Southerham Junction, from which absolute block signalling takes over through to Hastings. Signal boxes were situated at Berwick, Polegate Crossing, Hampden Park, Eastbourne, Pevensey and Westham, Bexhill and Bo-Peep Junction. There were two crossing boxes at Plumpton and Normans Bay.

==== 2015 Re-signalling ====
In 2013 a project by Network Rail drew plans to upgrade the route between Lewes and St Leonards to replace the semaphore signals and signal boxes with colour light signals which will be controlled from a new Railway Operations Centre at Three Bridges. On Friday 13 February 2015, Berwick, Polegate, Hampden Park, Eastbourne, Pevensey and Westham, Normans Bay and Bexhill signal boxes signalled their last trains, and over the weekend, the semaphore signals and current colour light signalling were replaced and new colour light signals installed and tested. The line reopened on Monday, 16 February 2015, with Hampden Park Signal Box being demolished over the weekend. Bexhill, Eastbourne and Berwick signal boxes are listed buildings and were saved from demolition, and the Polegate signal box was to be bought by the local town council to serve as a museum but was later demolished in November 2016. Pevensey signal box was also later demolished. Plumpton signal box was later closed on 8 February 2016 after the level crossing gates were replaced by barriers.

== Accidents ==
- Falmer station accident – 6 June 1851; 5 killed.
- Bo-Peep Junction accident – 23 June 1861; 10 injured
- Eastbourne station rail crash – 25 August 1958; 5 killed, 40 injured.
- Lewes derailment – 13 August 2026; 20 injured.

== Gallery ==
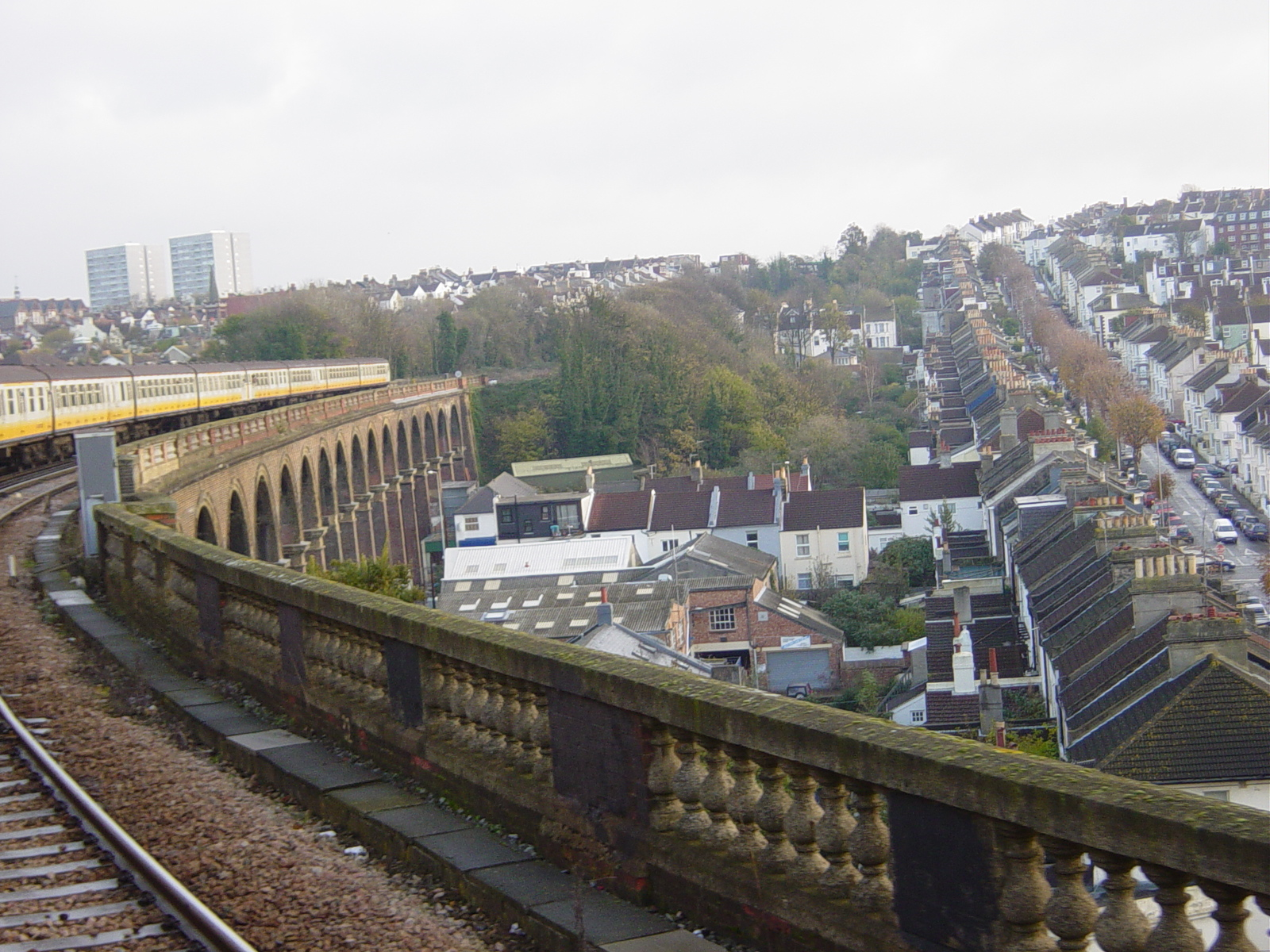
The last slam door train over the London Road Viaduct in November 2005

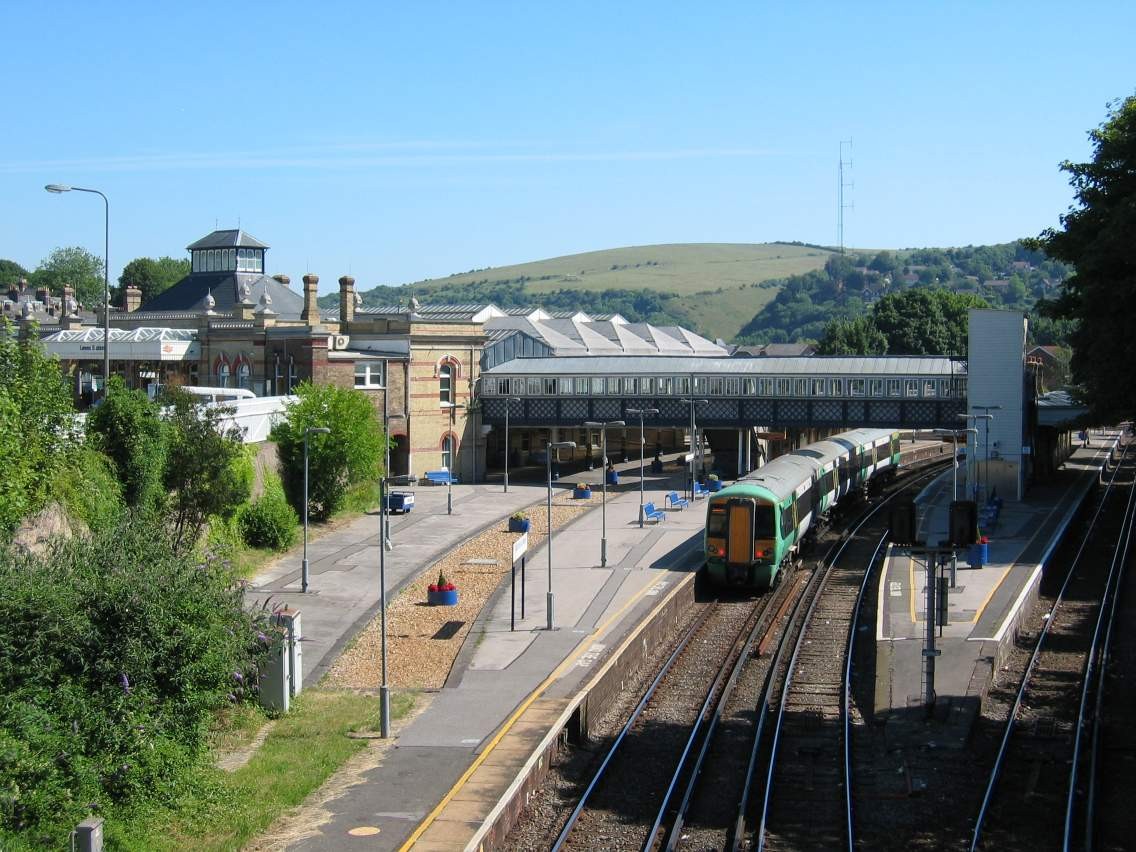
Lewes railway station on 15 July 2003 – looking east

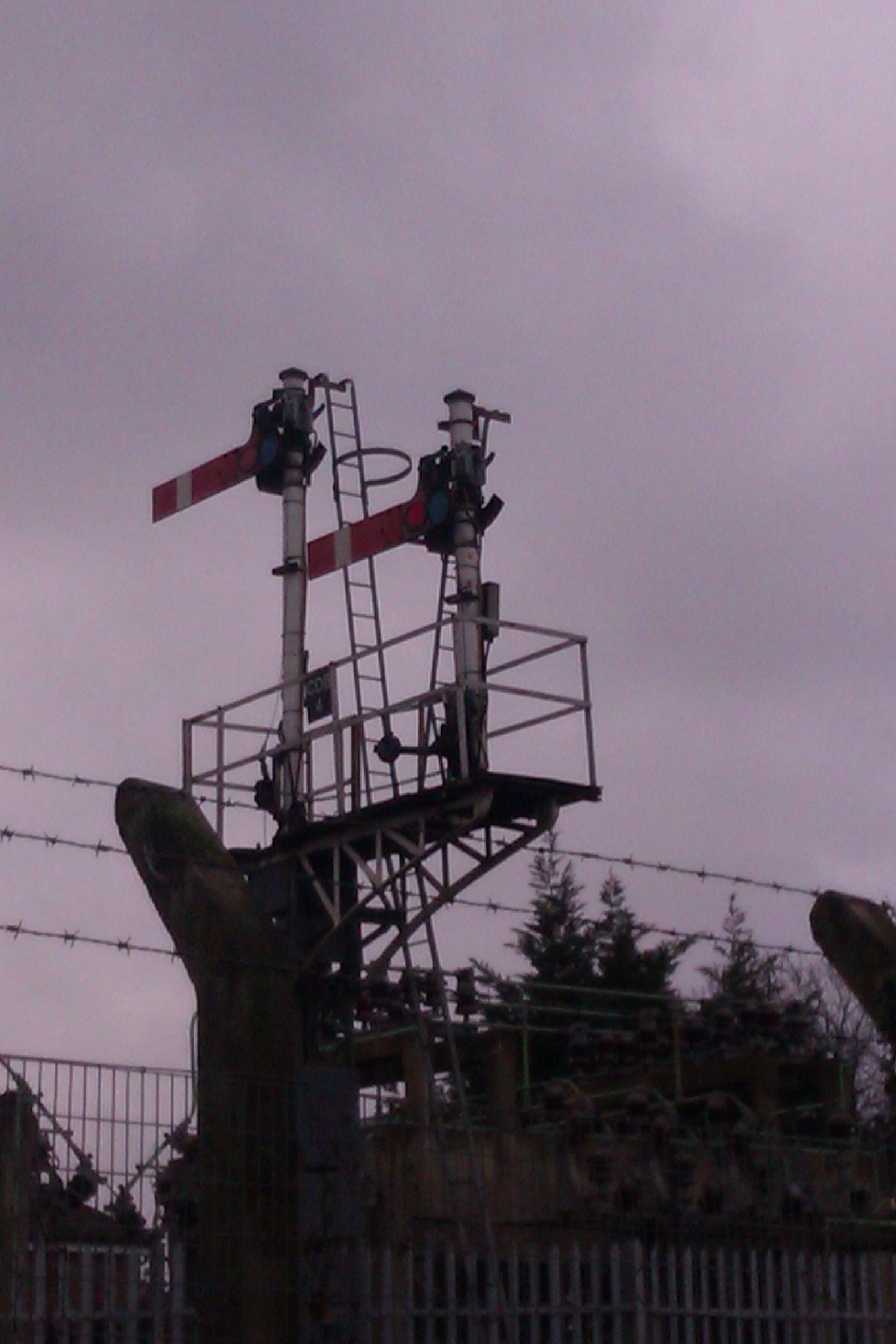
Semaphore signals at Willingdon Junction before resignalling

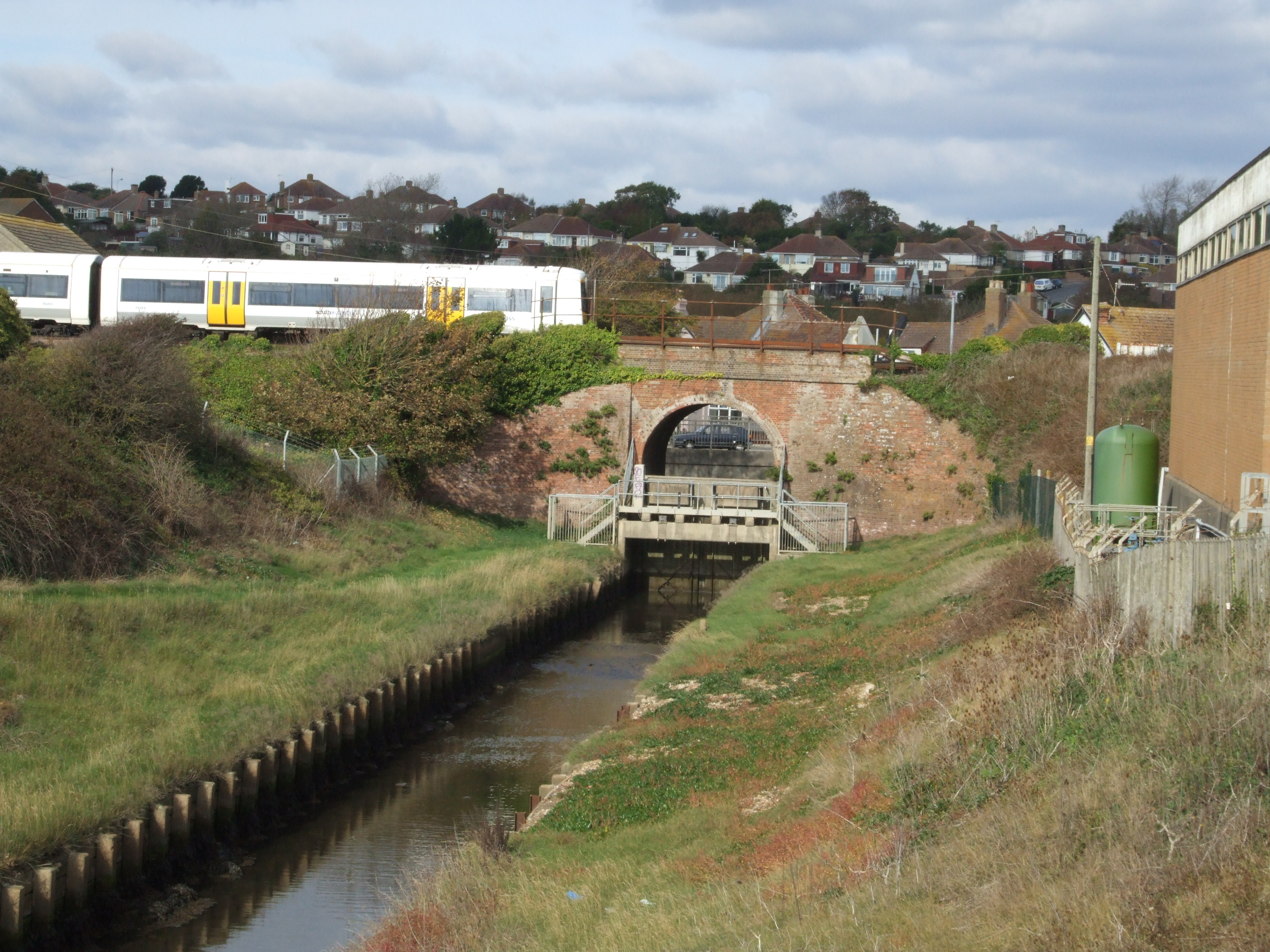
River Asten bridge, which delayed the building for six months

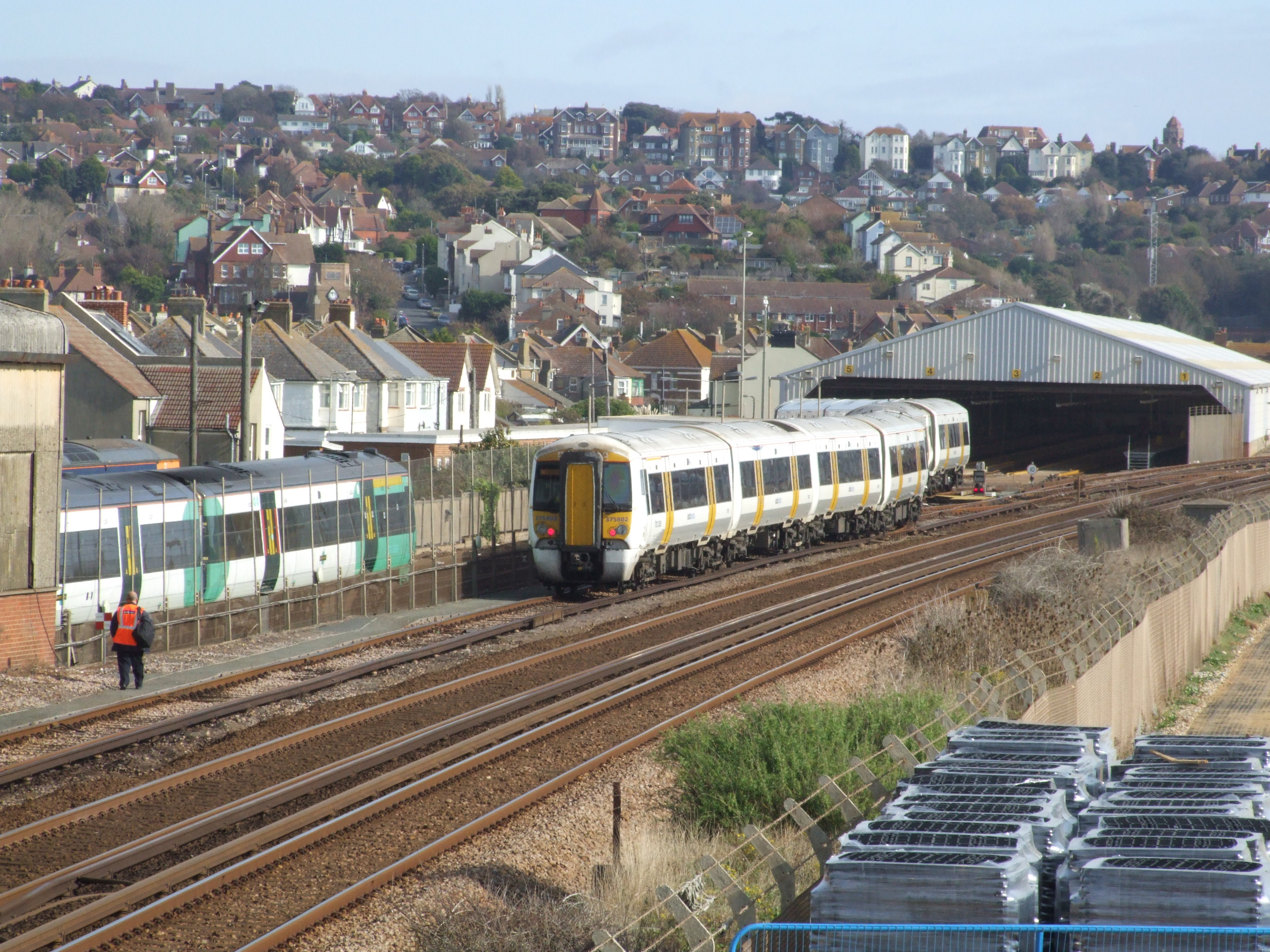
St Leonards depot at Bulverhythe, possibly near the site of Bulverhythe station

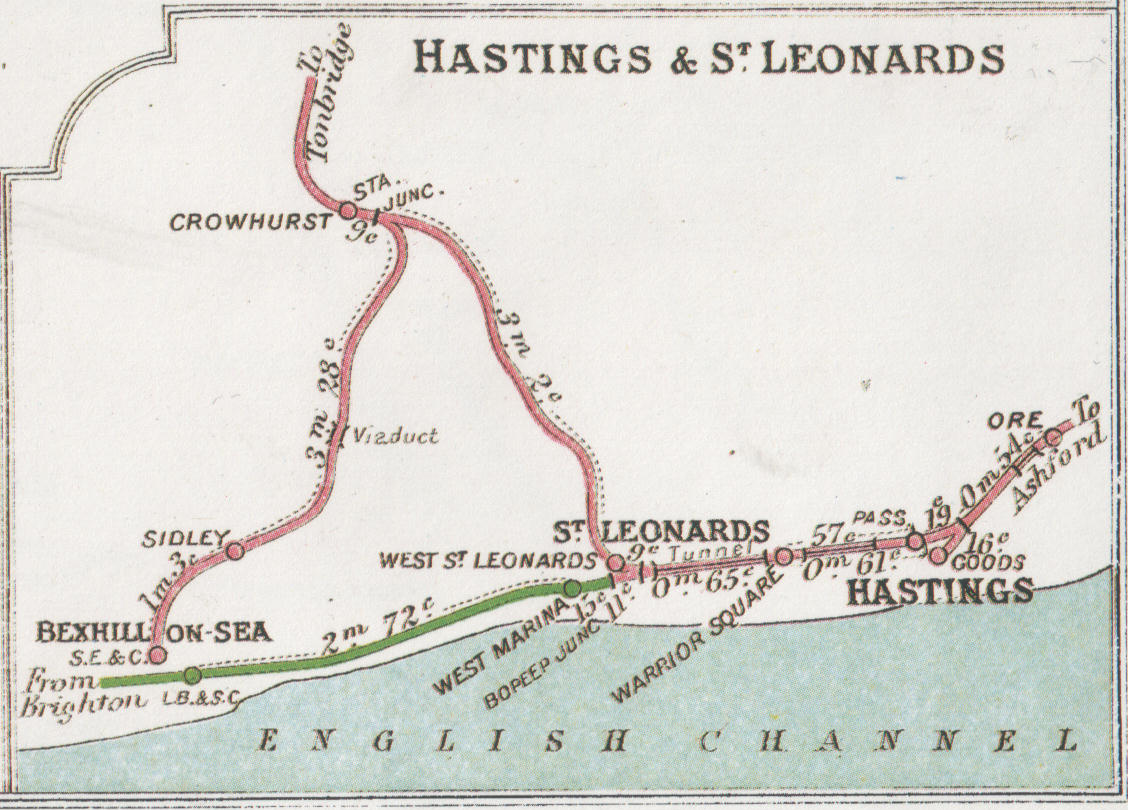
A 1914 Railway Clearing House map of the eastern end of the East Coastway line
