= Eastbourne Carriage Sidings =

Train stabling point in Eastbourne, East Sussex

Location
- Location: Eastbourne, East Sussex

Characteristics
- Owner: Network Rail
- Type: DMU, EMU

Eastbourne Carriage Sidings are located in Eastbourne, East Sussex, England, on the East Coastway Line near Eastbourne station.

== Present ==
They provide stabling for Southern Class 377 and 442 EMUs. There is also a carriage cleaning road and an engineers' siding.
