= Normans Bay railway station =

Railway station in East Sussex, England

Normans Bay
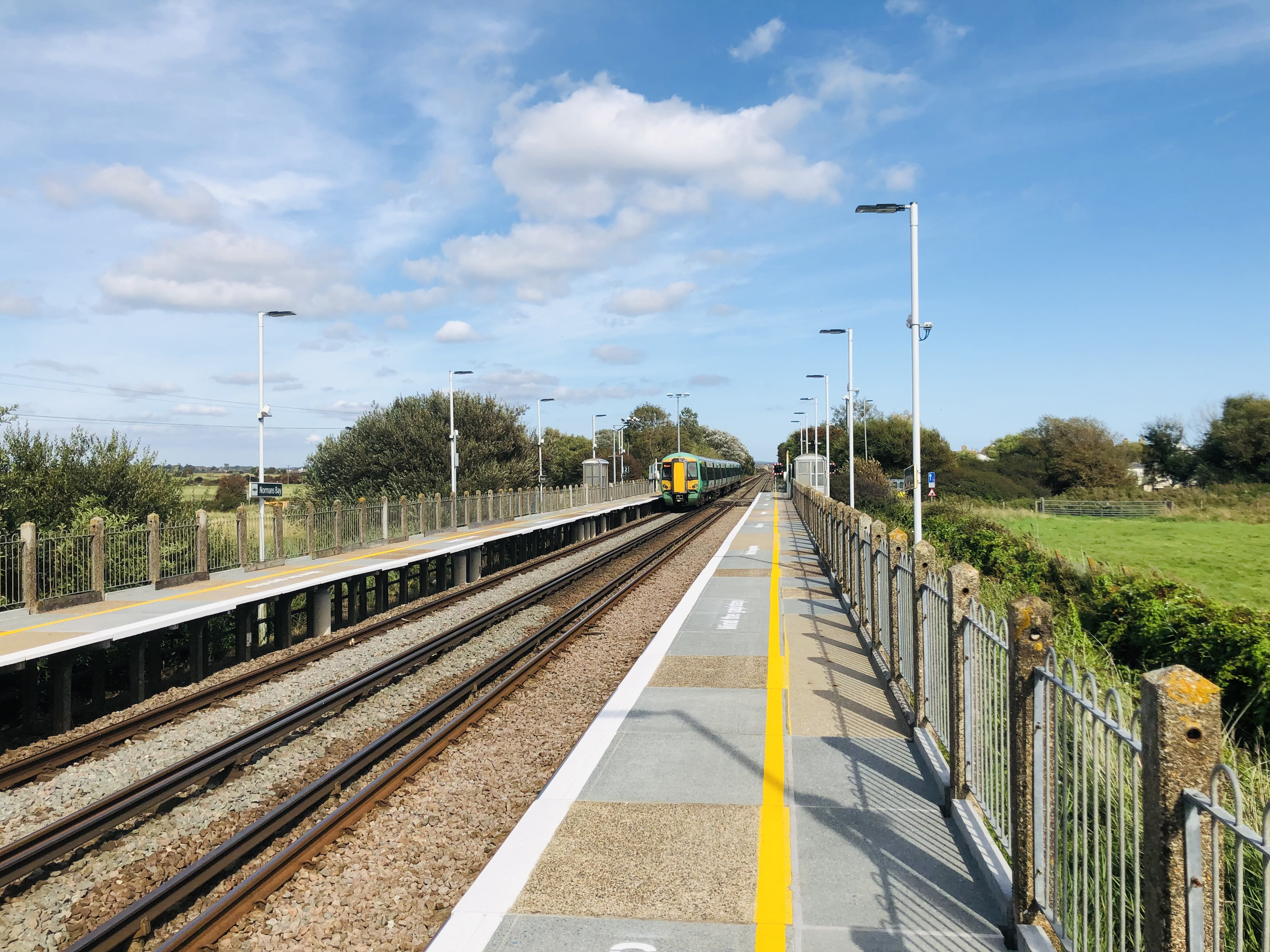
- The platforms, looking east

General information
- Location: Normans Bay, Rother; England
- Coordinates: 50.826°N 0.389°E
- Grid reference: TQ683056
- Manager: Southern
- Platforms: 2

Other information
- Station code: NSB
- Classification: DfT category F2

History
- Original company: London, Brighton and South Coast Railway
- Pre-grouping: London, Brighton and South Coast Railway
- Post-grouping: Southern Railway

Key dates
- 11 September 1905: Opened as Pevensey Sluice
- 1905: Renamed Normans Bay Halt
- 5 May 1969: Renamed Normans Bay

Passengers
- 2021/22: ▲17,126
- 2022/23: ▲17,854
- 2023/24: ▲20,558
- 2024/25: ▲22,490
- 2025/26: ▼18,542
Location
Notes
- Passenger statistics from the Office of Rail and Road

Normans Bay railway station serves Normans Bay in East Sussex. It is on the East Coastway Line, and train services are provided by Southern.

== History ==
The Havensmouth level crossing as it was prior to 2015 with metal gates

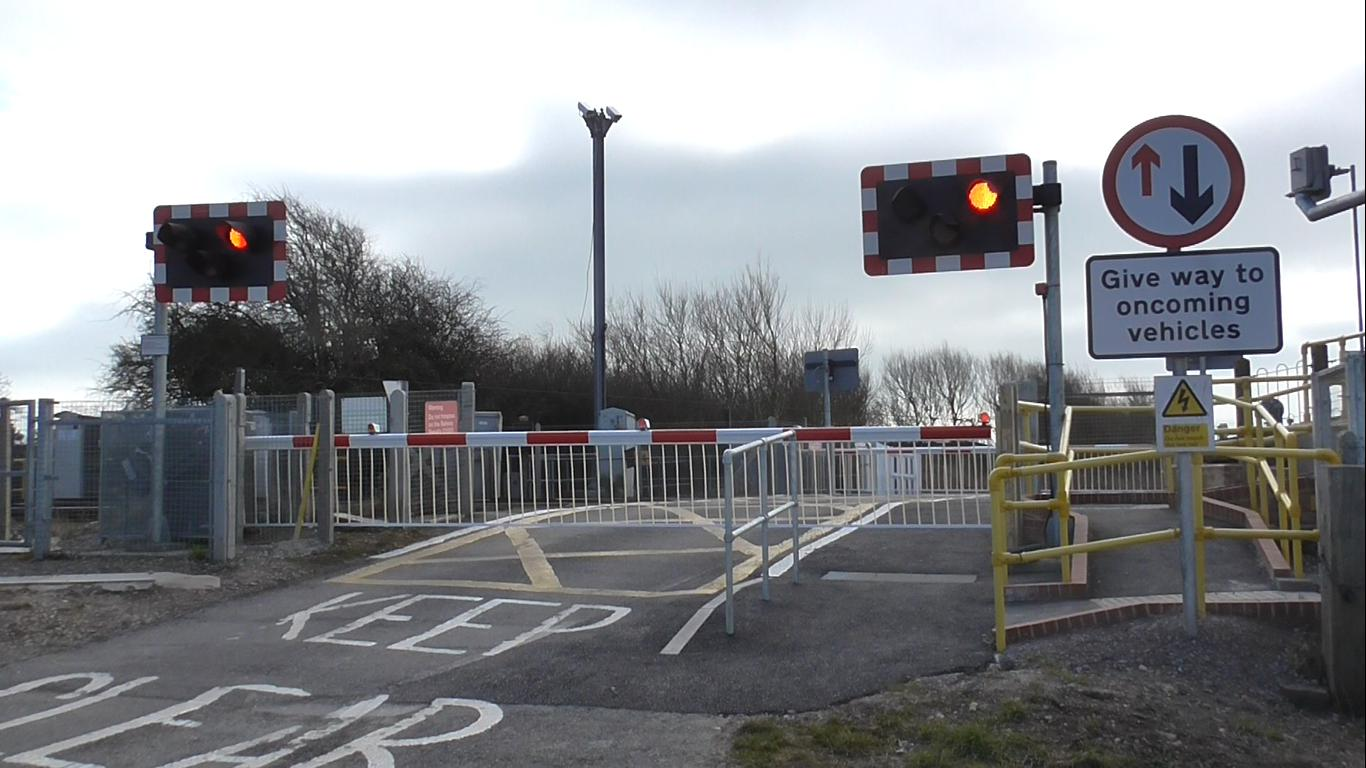
The automated level crossing in February 2015 soon after its upgrade

The station was opened on 11 September 1905 and was originally named Pevensey Sluice, but later that year it was renamed Normans Bay Halt. The name was altered to Normans Bay on 5 May 1969.

A level crossing named "Havensmouth" by Network Rail is in operation at Normans Bay, which was upgraded to automatic full length barriers in 2015 in co-operation with the upgrading of part of the East Coastway Line.

A self-service ticket machine was installed at the station in 2016.

== Services ==
All services at Normans Bay are operated by Southern using Class 171 DMUs and Class 377 EMUs.

The typical off-peak service in trains per hour is:

- 1 tph to London Victoria via Gatwick Airport
- 1 tph to Ore via Hastings

Additional services between Brighton, Hastings and Ore, and between Eastbourne and Ashford International call at the station during the peak hours.

Preceding station	National Rail	Following station
Pevensey Bay Limited Service	Southern East Coastway Line	Cooden Beach
Pevensey & Westham	Southern East Coastway Line	Cooden Beach
