= Cooksbridge railway station =

Railway station in East Sussex, England

Cooksbridge
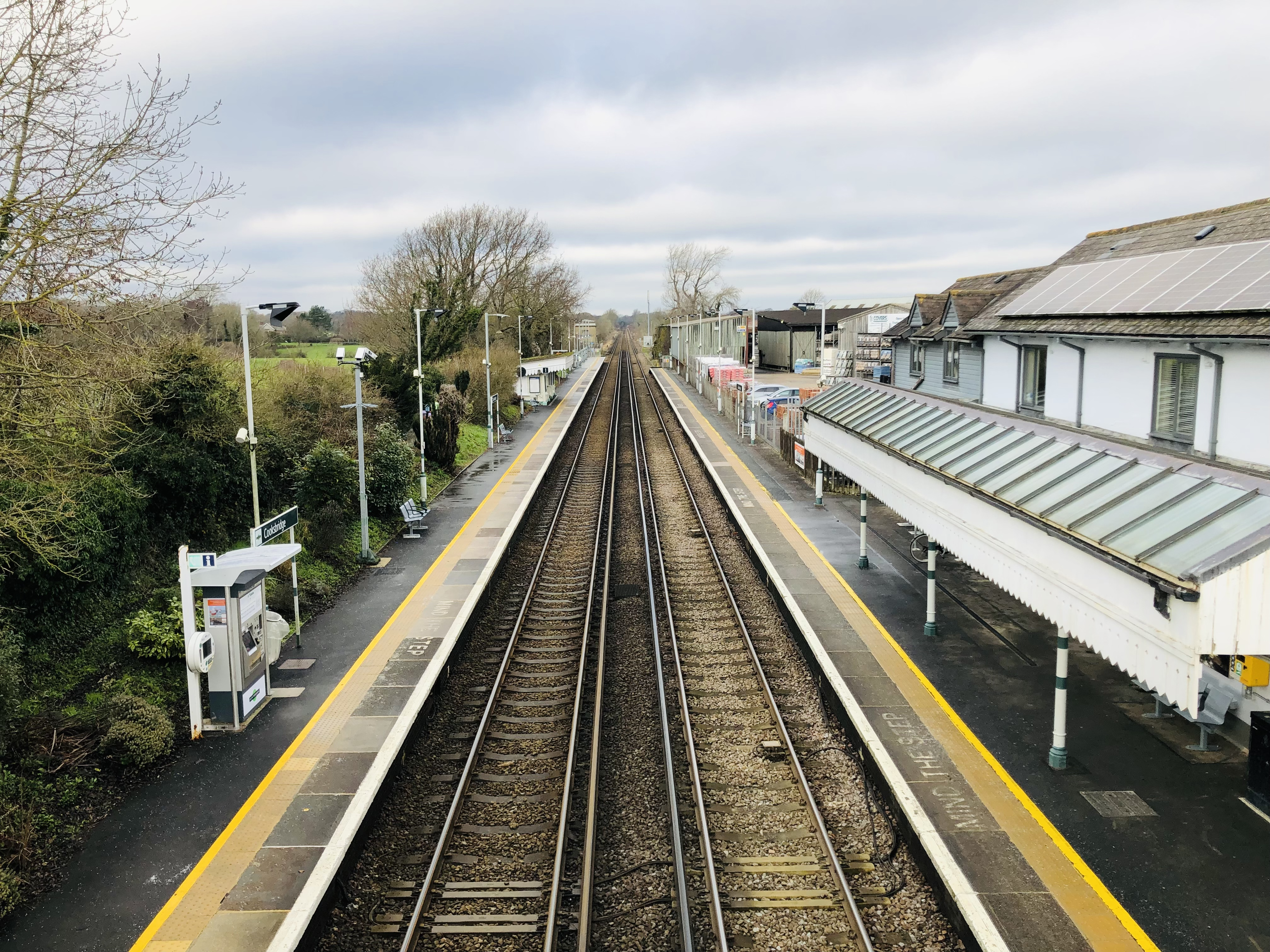
- The platforms at Cooksbridge, looking northwest

General information
- Location: Cooksbridge, Lewes District, East Sussex; England
- Coordinates: 50.904°N 0.009°W
- Grid reference: TQ400134
- Managed by: Southern
- Platforms: 2

Other information
- Station code: CBR
- Classification: DfT category F2

History
- Original company: London, Brighton and South Coast Railway
- Pre-grouping: London, Brighton and South Coast Railway
- Post-grouping: Southern Railway

Key dates
- 1 October 1847: Opened as Cook's Bridge
- May 1885: Renamed Cooksbridge

Passengers
- 2020/21: ▼21,152
- 2021/22: ▲47,552
- 2022/23: ▲62,220
- 2023/24: ▲80,692
- 2024/25: ▲91,322
Location
Notes
- Passenger statistics from the Office of Rail and Road

Cooksbridge railway station serves the village of Cooksbridge in East Sussex, England. It is on the East Coastway Line, 47 miles 31 chains (76.3 km) from London Bridge via Redhill. Train services are provided by Southern.

The station is unstaffed. A PERTIS ticket machine was installed in 2008 on both the London-bound and the Lewes-bound platform.

== History ==
Cooksbridge lies on the London, Brighton and South Coast Railway "cut-off" line between Keymer Junction, near Wivelsfield on the Brighton Main Line, and Lewes. The erstwhile Brighton, Lewes and Hastings Railway were authorised to build the line in 1845; the LBSCR purchased it and opened the link on 1 October 1847. The station opened as Cook's Bridge on the same date. The first station master was Richard Strevett who stayed until promoted to Hailsham on 17 August 1861. This replacement (George Bennett) lasted only a few weeks, arriving on 16 August 1861 and returning to his old job (porter at Brighton) on 6 September 1861. His replacement, Alfred Paver, was appointed on 13 September 1861.

The initial services were very sparse. The May 1848 timetable shows Up Trains to London at 8.30 am and 5.50 pm and a London arrivals at 9am. (Afternoon passengers were directed to travel via Lewes on the 5.50 pm train).

During May 2020, Platform 1 was extended to accommodate eight-coach trains, as opposed to a previous six-coach trains.

== Services ==
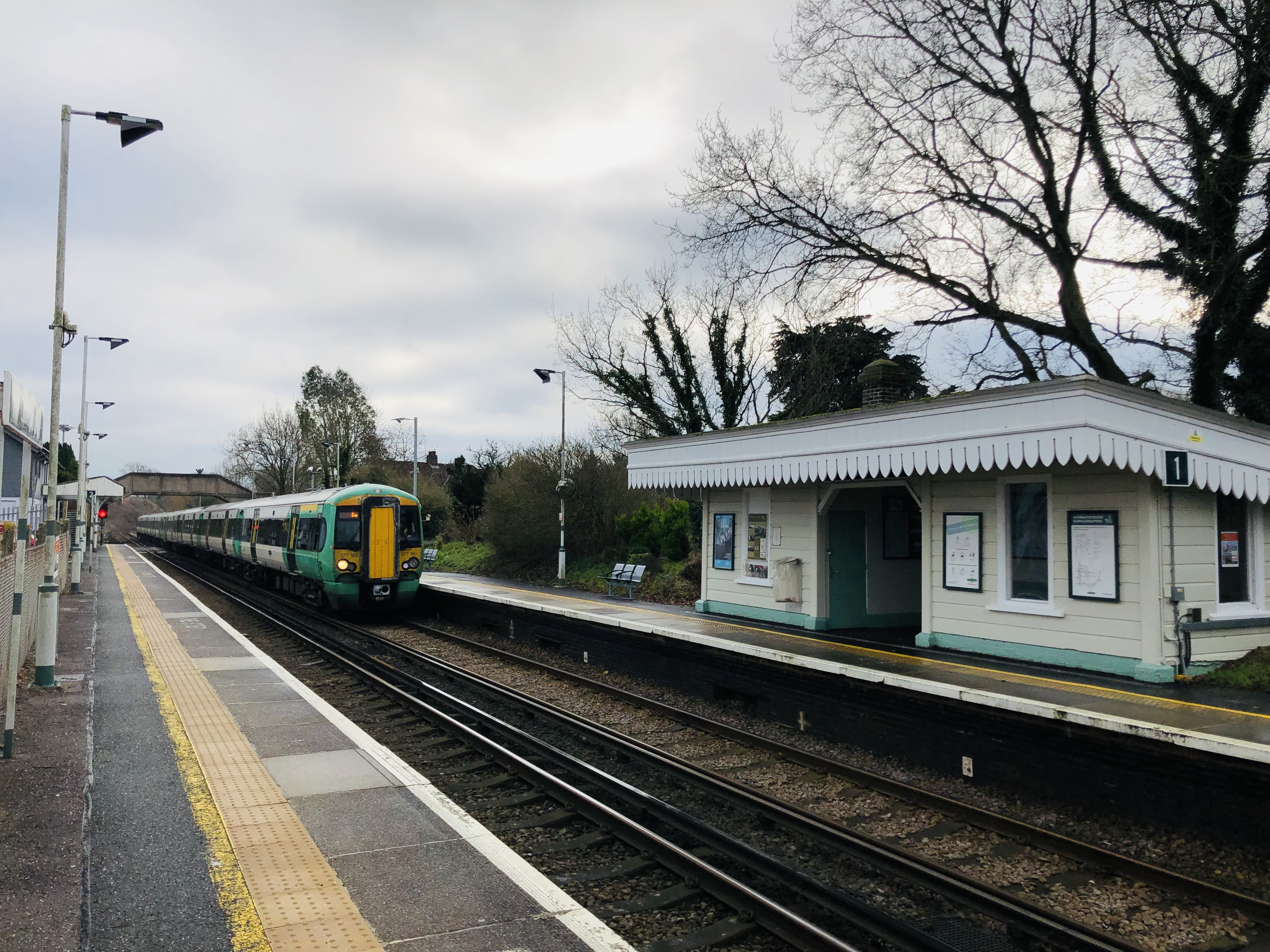
A Class 377 set passes through Cooksbridge, with a Southern service to London Bridge.

All services at Cooksbridge are operated by Southern using Class 377 EMUs.

The typical off-peak service in trains per hour is:

- 1 tph to London Victoria via Gatwick Airport
- 1 tph to Eastbourne

On Sundays, the service is still hourly, but with Eastbourne trains continuing to Ore via Hastings

Prior to December 2019, the station was served by a limited weekday service only with no weekend services. In December 2019, a regular hourly service was introduced on weekdays and Saturdays, followed by an hourly Sunday service in May 2020.

Preceding station	National Rail	Following station
Wivelsfield or Plumpton	Southern East Coastway Line	Lewes
