= Pevensey & Westham railway station =

Railway station in East Sussex, England

Pevensey and Westham
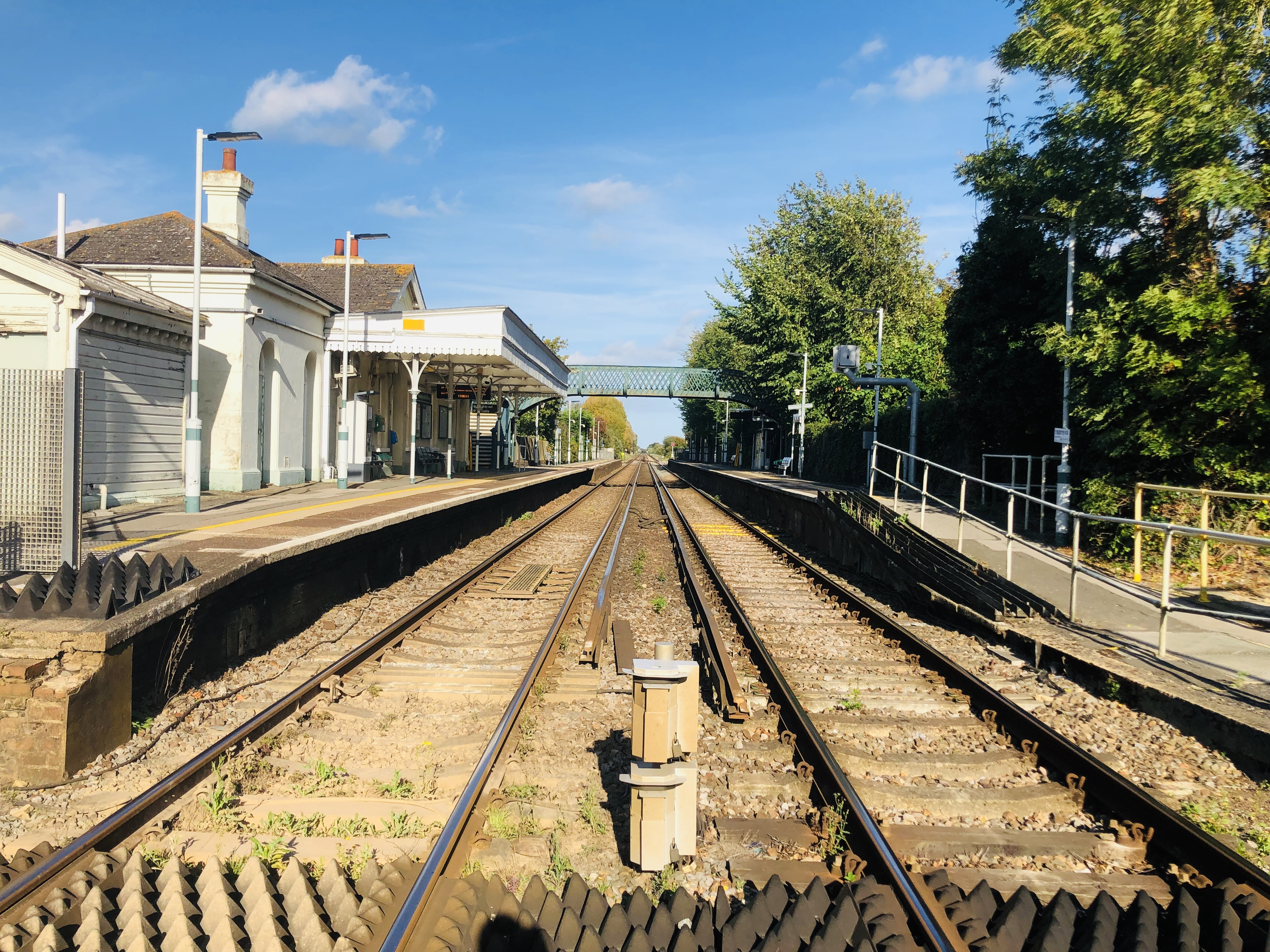
- The platforms at Pevensey & Westham station, looking east

General information
- Location: Westham, Wealden; England
- Coordinates: 50.81583°N 0.32475°E
- Grid reference: TQ638043
- Managed by: Southern
- Platforms: 2

Other information
- Station code: PEV
- Classification: DfT category E

History
- Opened: 27 June 1846

Passengers
- 2020/21: ▼55,748
- 2021/22: ▲0.143 million
- 2022/23: ▲0.153 million
- 2023/24: 0.153 million
- 2024/25: ▲0.166 million
Location
Notes
- Passenger statistics from the Office of Rail and Road

Pevensey & Westham railway station serves the villages of Pevensey and Westham in East Sussex, England. It is on the East Coastway Line, and train services are provided by Southern. The station is located around 4 miles (6.4 km) from Eastbourne town centre, and is one of four stations serving the town (the others being Polegate, Hampden Park and Eastbourne).

== History ==
The station opened as Westham and Pevensey on 27 June 1846 with the opening of the line between Lewes and St.Leonards (Bulverhythe). It was renamed Pevensey & Westham in January 1851 but in November 1851 was renamed Pevensey until January 1890 when it received its present name. Electric trains began serving the station in 1935. The signal box closed in 2015 when new signalling was introduced controlled from Three Bridges Regional Operations Centre.

== Gallery ==
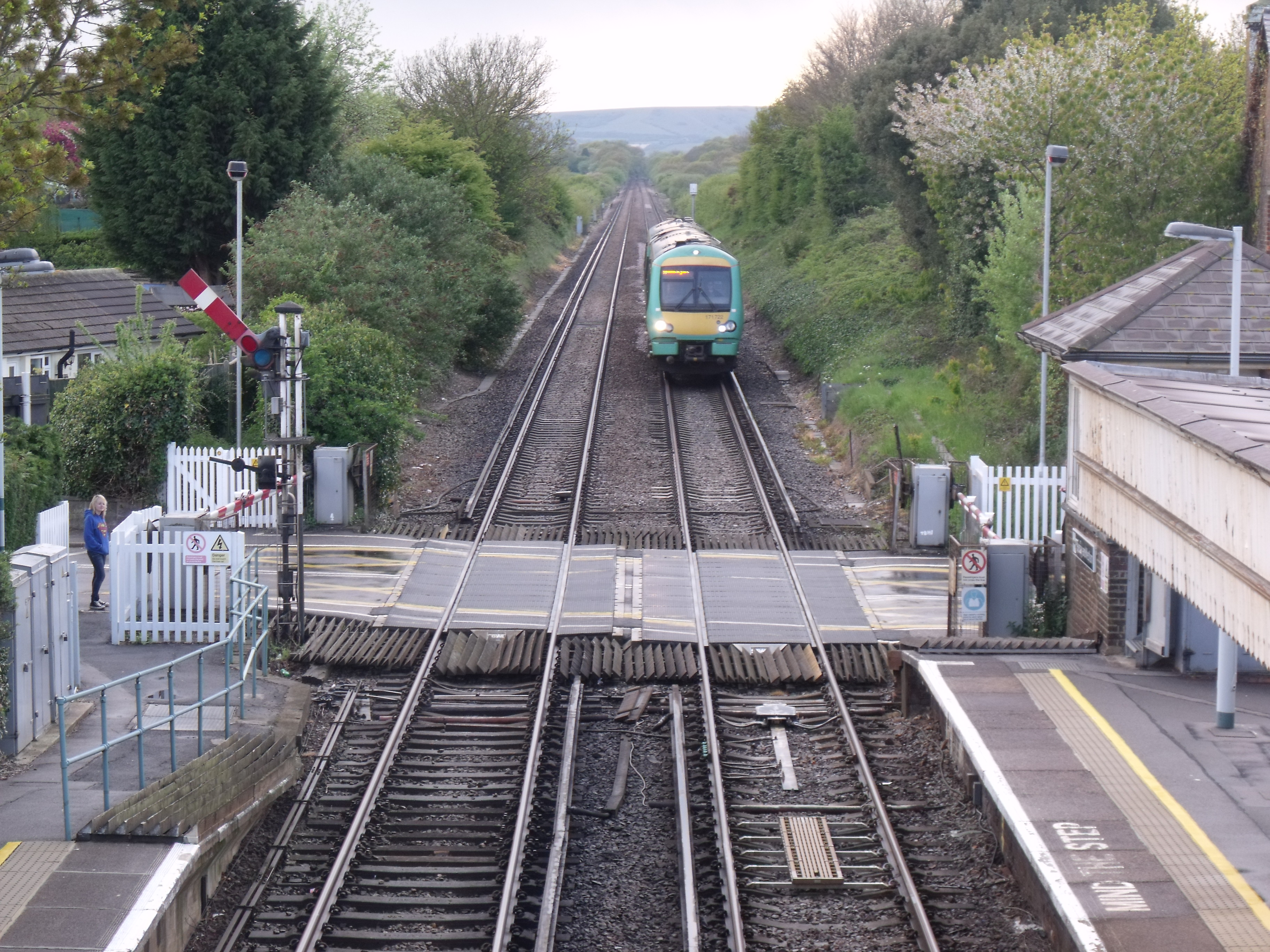
View from Pevensey and Westham railway station looking towards Eastbourne

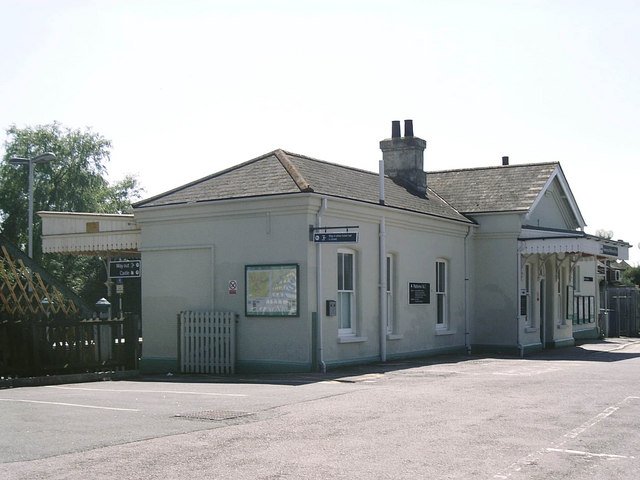
Station building at Pevensey and Westham station

View from level crossing towards Eastbourne from Pevensey and Westham station

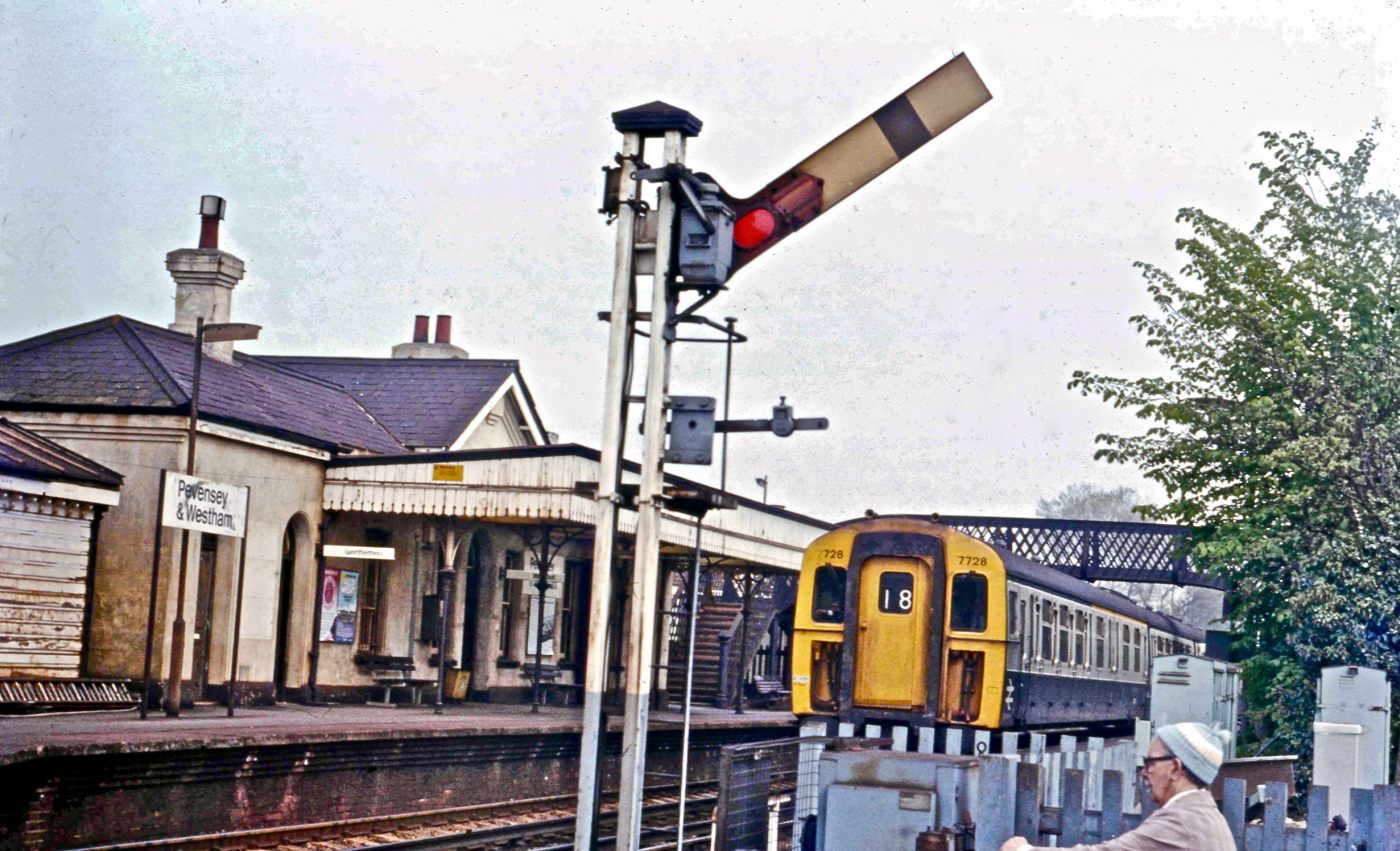
Semaphore signal and 4-VEP emu in 1985

== Services ==
All services at Pevensey & Westham are operated by Southern using Class 171 DMUs and Class 377 EMUs.

The typical off-peak service in trains per hour is:

- 1 tph to London Victoria via Gatwick Airport
- 1 tph to Eastbourne
- 1 tph to Ore
- 1 tph to Ashford International

During the peak hours, a number of additional services between Brighton, Hastings and Ore also call at the station.

Preceding station	National Rail	Following station
Hampden Park	Southern East Coastway Line	Normans Bay
Hampden Park	Southern East Coastway Line	Pevensey Bay Limited Service
