= Hampden Park railway station =

Railway station in East Sussex, England

Hampden Park
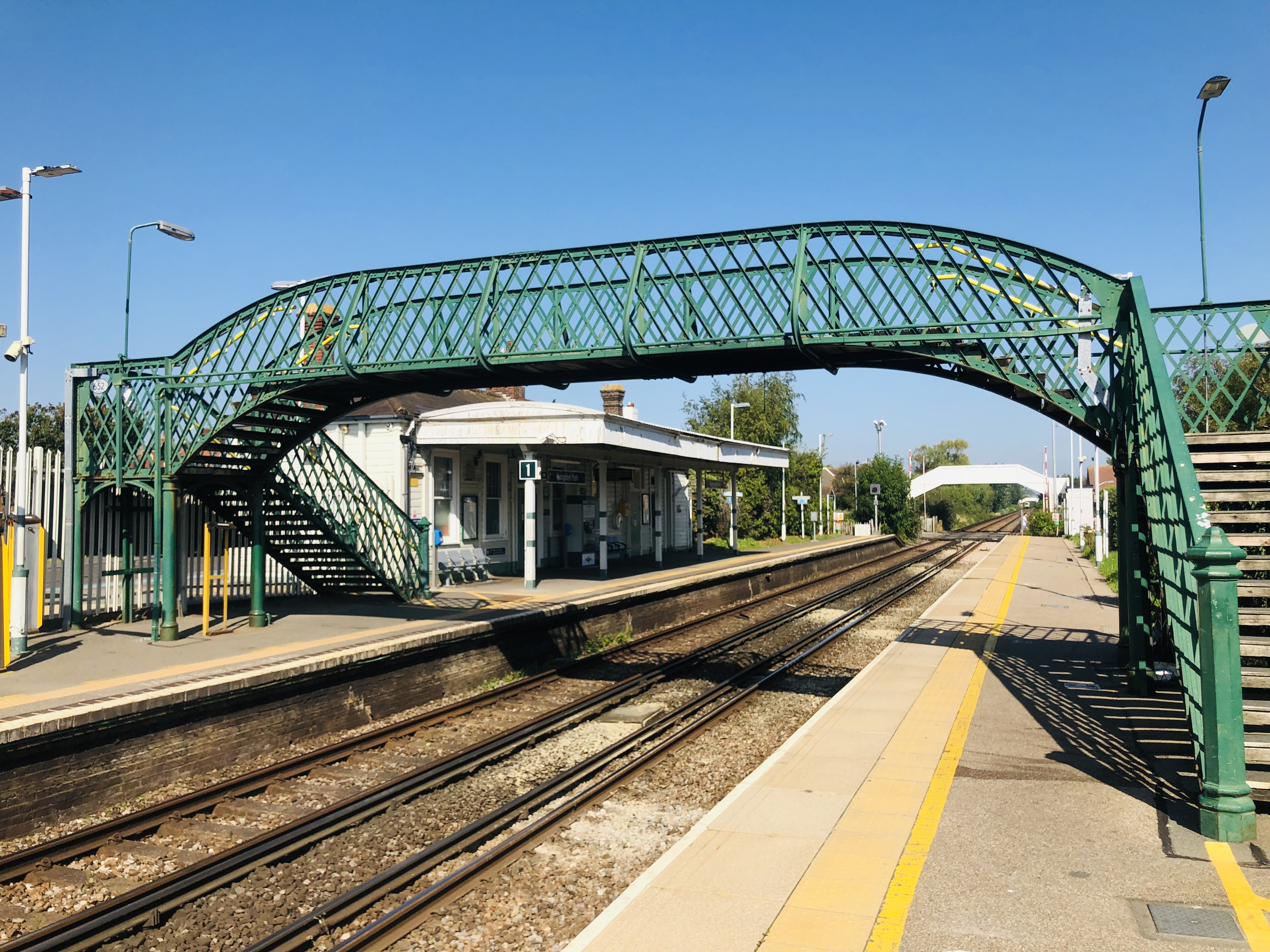
- The platforms at Hampden Park, looking north

General information
- Location: Hampden Park, Eastbourne; England
- Coordinates: 50.796°N 0.279°E
- Grid reference: TQ607021
- Manager: Southern
- Platforms: 2

Other information
- Station code: HMD
- Classification: DfT category E

History
- Original company: London, Brighton and South Coast Railway
- Pre-grouping: London, Brighton and South Coast Railway
- Post-grouping: Southern Railway

Key dates
- 1 January 1888: Opened as Willingdon
- 1 July 1903: renamed Hampden Park for Willingdon
- ?: Renamed Hampden Park

Passengers
- 2020/21: ▼0.306 million
- Interchange: ▼40,484
- 2021/22: ▲0.626 million
- Interchange: ▲0.101 million
- 2022/23: ▲0.695 million
- Interchange: ▲0.121 million
- 2023/24: ▲0.767 million
- Interchange: ▲0.167 million
- 2024/25: ▲0.861 million
- Interchange: ▲0.186 million
Location
Notes
- Passenger statistics from the Office of Rail and Road

Hampden Park railway station serves Hampden Park in the northern areas of the seaside town of Eastbourne in East Sussex. It is on the East Coastway Line, and train services are provided by Southern. The station is sometimes used as an interchange to avoid travelling into Eastbourne itself.

== History ==
Opened on 1 January 1888, it was originally called Willingdon, but was renamed Hampden Park for Willingdon on 1 July 1903. The name became Hampden Park under British Railways. It is one of two stations serving Eastbourne, the other being Eastbourne railway station

== Location ==
The station is located on a spur line originally termed the Eastbourne Branch. There was a rarely used triangular junction between Polegate and the now-closed Stone Cross which allowed trains to bypass the Branch; the track has now been lifted. Services along the coast have almost invariably served Eastbourne, where they either terminate or reverse to continue along the East Coastway. This in turn means that many trains pass through Hampden Park station twice on the same journey - once on the way into Eastbourne, and once on the way out - although most do not stop on both occasions, passing through without stopping in one or other direction.

Because of this arrangement, some connections are advertised to allow passengers on the Victoria-Eastbourne service to use Hampden Park to pick up the stopping service to Hastings and vice versa.

The level crossing at Hampden Park is thought to be one of the busiest in the country, with an average of sixteen train movements an hour off-peak, and this can lead to significant traffic congestion on adjacent roads. The signal box which controlled the crossing was abolished in February 2015 when the controls were transferred to Three Bridges Regional Operations Centre.

== Services ==
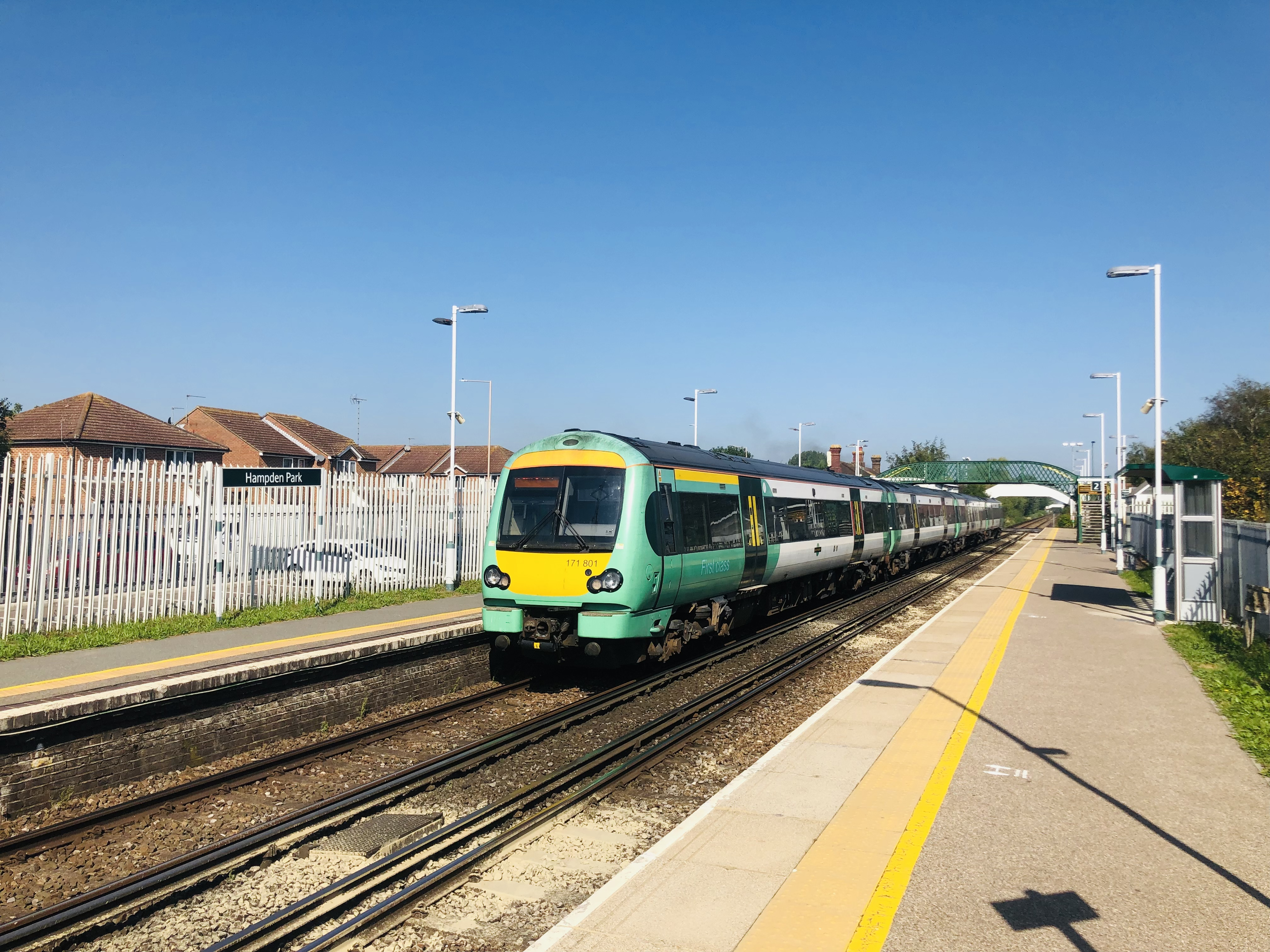
171801 at Hampden Park with a service bound for Ashford International

The typical Monday-Friday off-peak service pattern is:

- 2tph to London Victoria (of which one stops here before Eastbourne and one stops after Eastbourne);
- 2tph to Brighton (one of which stops before Eastbourne, and the other after Eastbourne);
- 2tph to Ore (one of which stops before Eastbourne, and the other after Eastbourne);
- 1tph to Ashford International (stopping after Eastbourne);
- 3tph to Eastbourne only.

Preceding station	National Rail	Following station
Polegate	Southern; East Coastway line	Eastbourne
Pevensey & Westham	Southern; East Coastway line	Eastbourne
