= Bonfire Night =

Annual event dedicated to bonfires, fireworks and celebrations

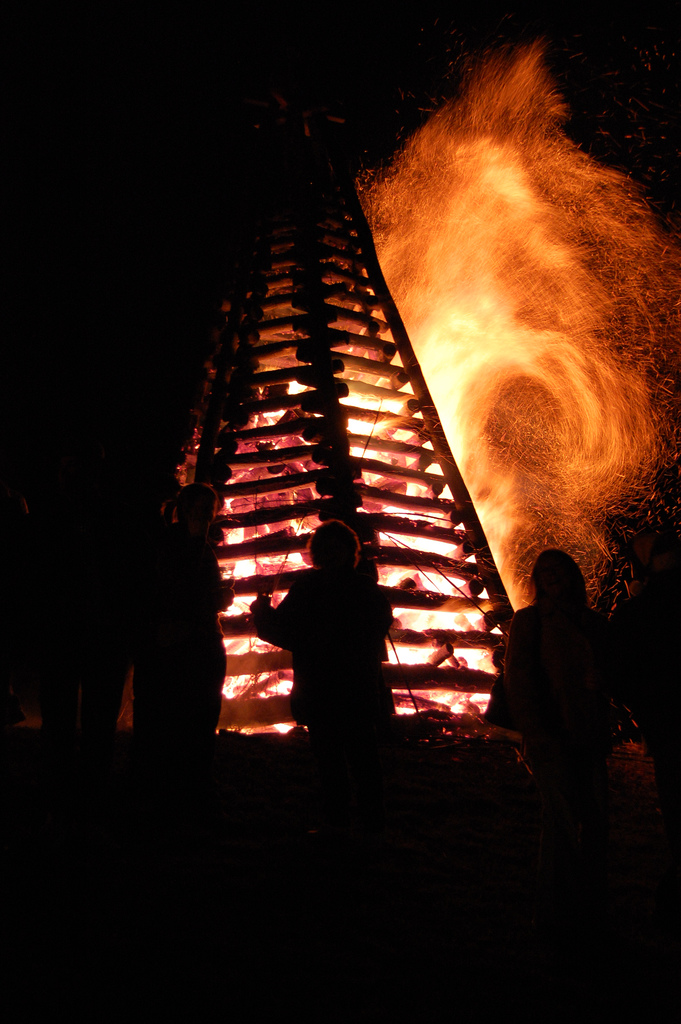
Christmas Eve celebration bonfire in Louisiana, United States

Bonfire Night is a name given to various yearly events marked by bonfires and fireworks. These include Guy Fawkes Night (5 November) in Great Britain; All Hallows' Eve (31 October); May Eve (30 April); Midsummer Eve/Saint John's Eve (23 June); the Eleventh Night (11 July) among Northern Ireland Protestants; and the Feast of the Assumption (15 August) among Northern Ireland Catholics.

== Significance ==
In Great Britain, Bonfire Night is associated with the tradition of celebrating the failure of Guy Fawkes' actions on 5 November 1605. The British festival is, therefore, on 5 November, although some commercially driven events are held at a weekend near to the correct date, to maximise attendance. Bonfire Night's sectarian significance has generally been lost: it is now usually just a night of revelry with a bonfire and fireworks. An effigy of Guy Fawkes is sometimes burned. Celebrations are held throughout Great Britain; in some non-Catholic communities in Northern Ireland; and in some other parts of the Commonwealth. In many areas of the UK, celebrations also feature funfairs, family entertainment, and special food and drinks. In the Canadian province of Newfoundland and Labrador, 5 November is commemorated with bonfires and firework displays, and it is officially celebrated in South Africa.

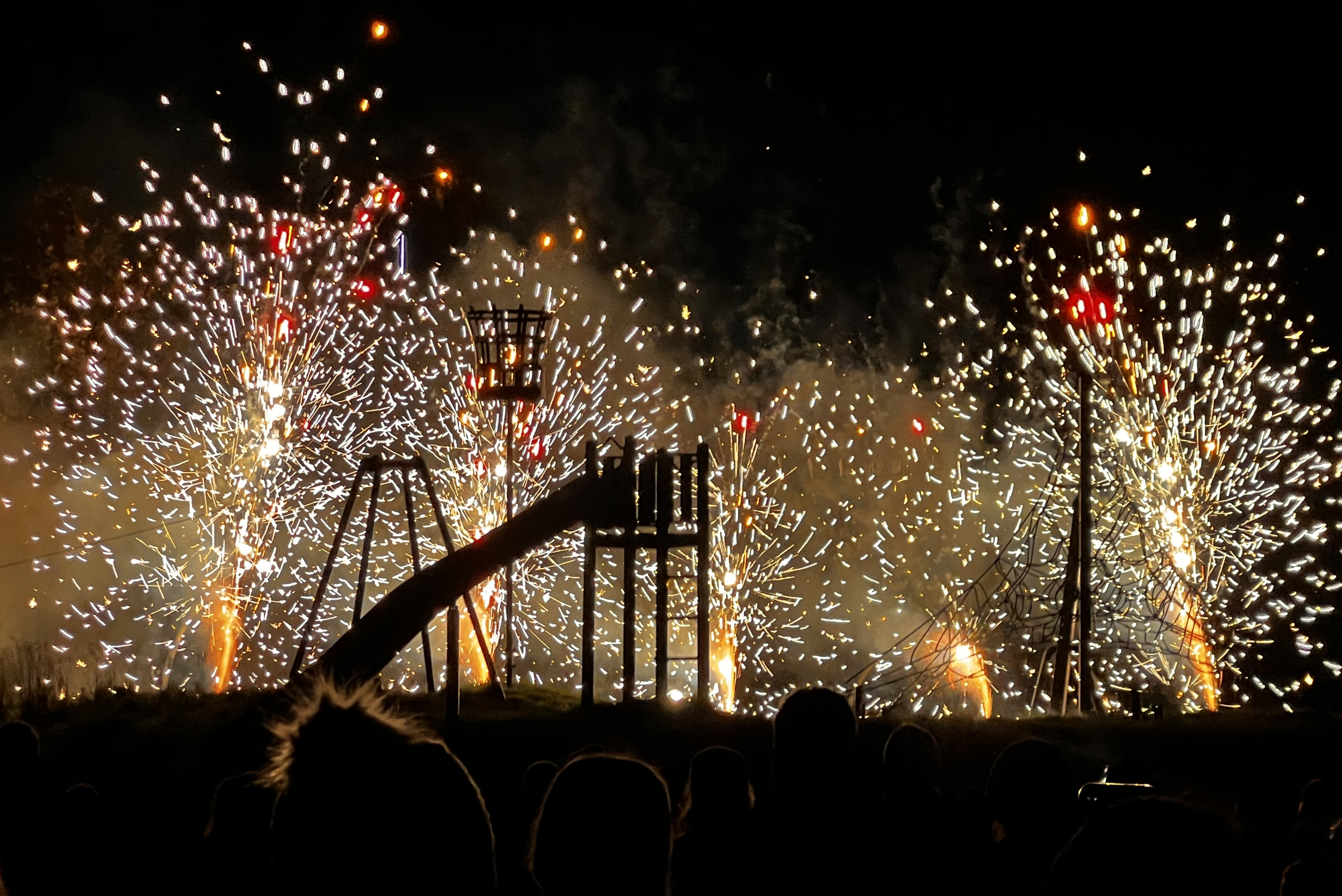
Fireworks display at a park in Worcestershire, England

In Northern Ireland, the term "Bonfire Night" can refer to the Eleventh Night celebrations of 11 July. Like 5 November, this Bonfire Night also has its roots in the sectarian struggle between Protestants and Catholics. Unlike 5 November the sectarian significance of 11 July is still strong. It celebrates the Battle of the Boyne of 1690, in which the Protestant William of Orange defeated the Catholic James II.

In the city of Cork and many rural parts of the Republic of Ireland "Bonfire Night" refers to 23 June, Saint John's Eve night. It has its origins in a religious celebration and originally featured prayers for bountiful crops. The night is linked to the summer solstice or Midsummer's Eve. Originally fires were lit to honour the goddess Áine as part of a Celtic celebration; the Catholic Church took over the pagan festival and linked it to the birth of St John. In the city of Limerick, "Bonfire Night" is held on May Eve, 30 April, on the eve of the Celtic festival of Bealtaine.

== Impact ==
Bonfire celebrations can pose a risk to public safety due to the possibility of fires, injuries, or fights. For example, in London, calls to firefighting services are nearly tripled on Bonfire Night. In Belfast, the July 2003 Eleventh Night resulted in £10,000 worth of damage to a park. The use of fireworks may lead to dangerous pyrotechnic incidents. In parts of the Caribbean, laws banning fireworks and explosives have muted the occasion, and safety concerns in New Zealand have resulted in restrictions on fireworks use, although public firework displays remain popular there.

The tradition of Bonfire Night has been criticised for its environmental impact. A 1994 study conducted in Oxford, England, found a four-fold increase in dioxin and furan concentration in the air after a Bonfire Night celebration. In 2005 a Bonfire Night in Newfoundland prompted the provincial Minister of Environment and Conservation to remind the general public of their responsibilities for safety and the environment. As fireworks and loud noises can be frightening for cats and dogs, Bonfire Night can be a challenging time for pet owners. The RSPCA reports that calls about animals distressed by fireworks surge by over 200% during the first week of November each year.

== Food ==
There are many food items that are associated with Bonfire Night. Toffee apples, treacle toffee, black peas and parkin, hog roast, and even the jacket potato, are traditionally eaten around Bonfire Night in parts of England. Also, some families eat soups to warm up on a cold night and toast marshmallows over the fire.
