= Rye Bonfire =

Annual bonfire event in Rye, East Sussex

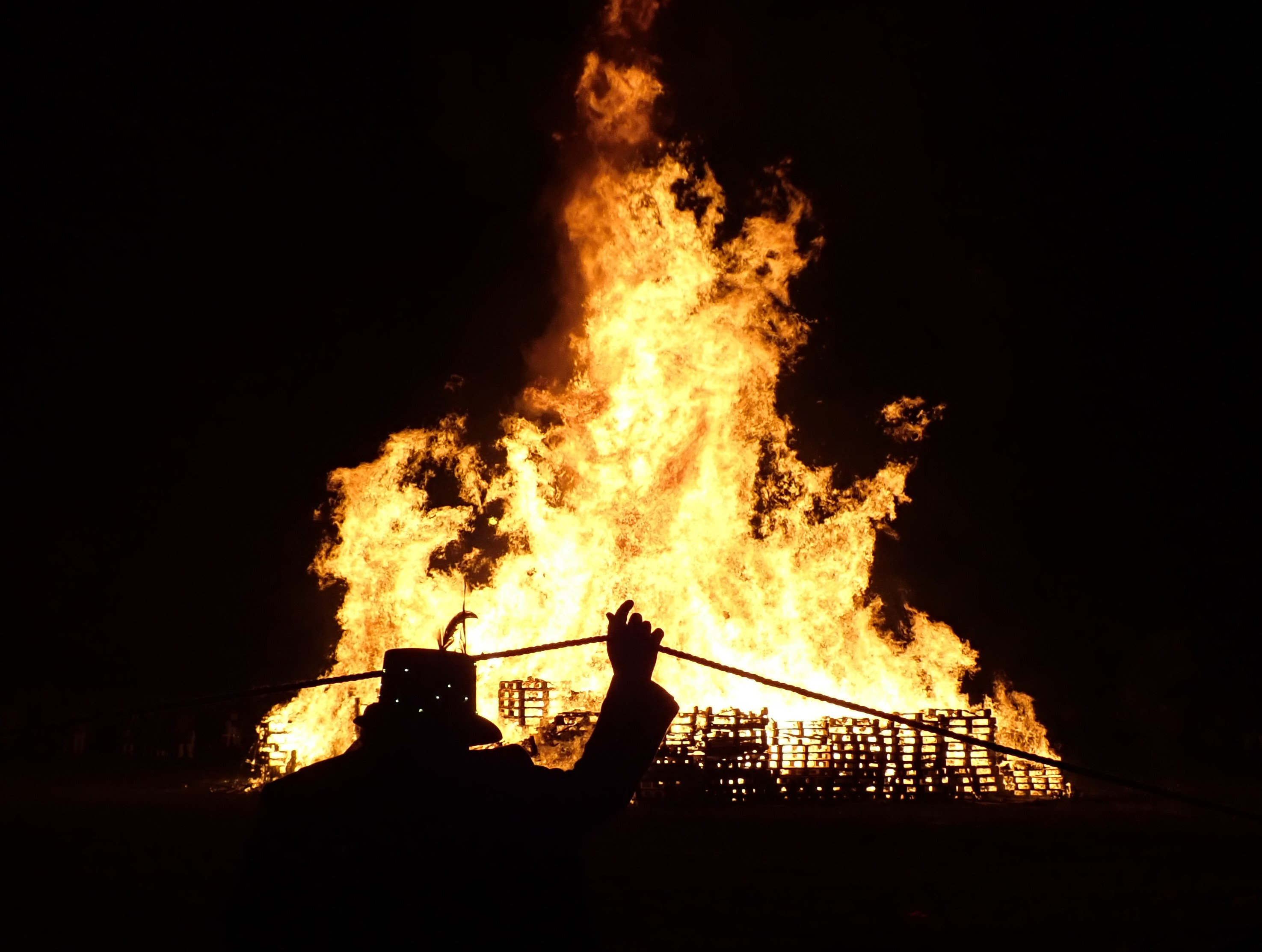
- Rye Bonfire 2024
- Status: active
- Frequency: annually
- Location: Rye, East Sussex
- Coordinates: 50°57′09″N 0°44′14″E
- Attendance: c. 10,000 (2024)
- Website: www.ryebonfire.co.uk

The Rye Bonfire, also known as the Rye Fawkes Pageant, is an annual bonfire event in Rye, East Sussex, England. Run by the Rye and District Bonfire Society, the event occurs in November and includes a town parade, fireworks, and a bonfire usually featuring a boat burning.

== Overview ==
The Rye Bonfire is an annual bonfire event, occurring every November to celebrate Guy Fawkes Night. The event, started by a maroon, begins with a procession through the town, consisting of torch-wielding representatives from bonfire societies, Scorcher the dragon, and the Ryebellion drummers. The parade winds through the town of Rye, until ending at the Rye Salts where a bonfire, usually with a boat on top, is lit. The event then finishes with a firework display. The bonfire is organised by the Rye and District Bonfire Society, who fundraise throughout the year to be able to stage the event.

As of 2024, the event costs c. £20,000 to stage, which is all financed by the fundraising activities of the society. The annual attendance is estimated to be c. 10,000.

== History ==
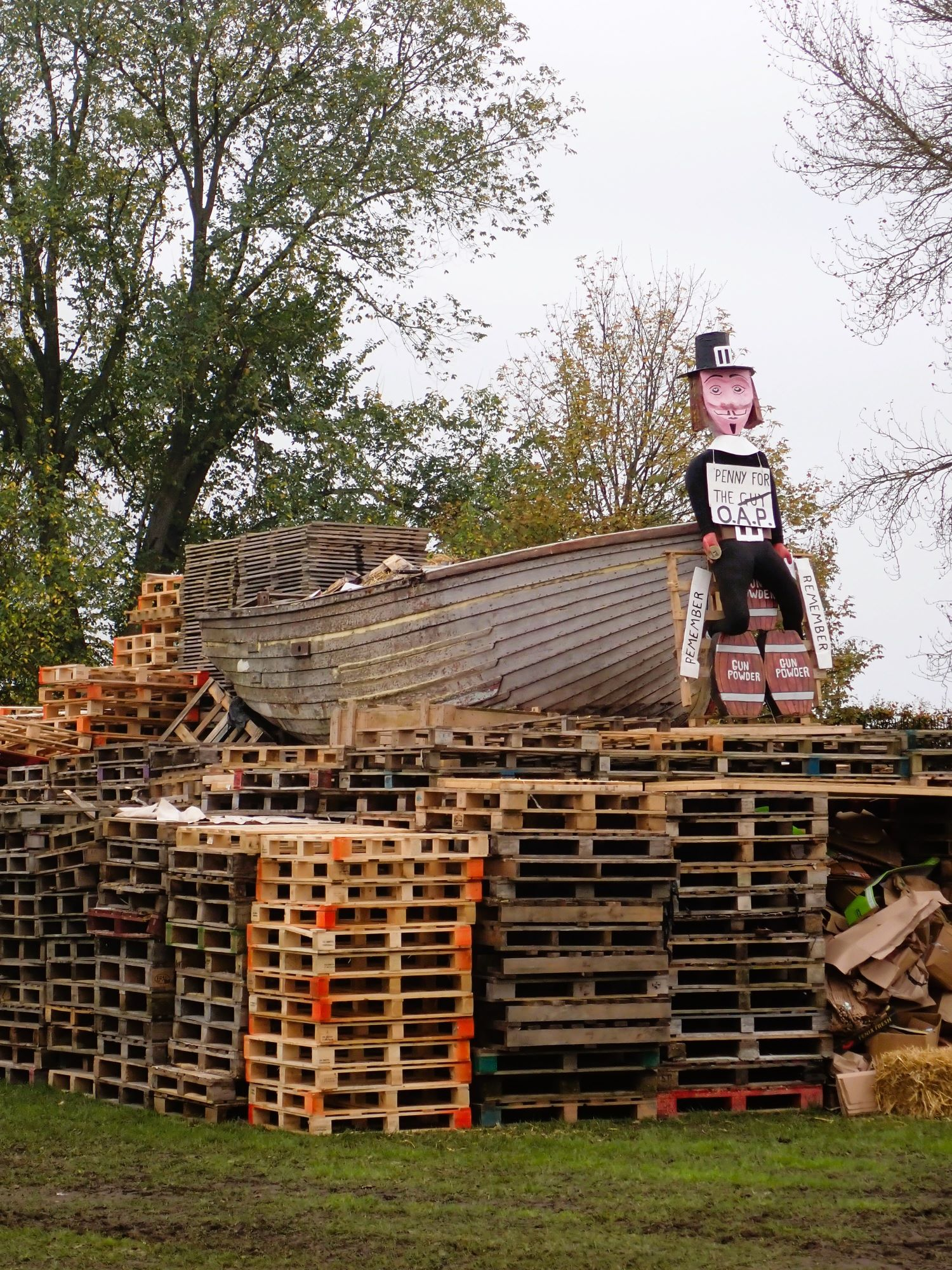
Daytime picture of the 2024 bonfire

The tradition and history behind the modern event, although not confirmed, has been researched. The boat burning custom started before the 1605 events that are commemorated by Guy Fawkes Night, with the late 14th century posited as the likely beginning. At that time the Rye town was subject to invasion and attack by the French, and the inhabitants of Rye would implement a "scorched earth" policy and burn their boats rather than let them be captured. This led to the saying that "Rye Burns Its Boats". Following the lessening of the threat from France, the annual bonfire and boat burning continued, and became a night of "mob rule" and "settling of scores". In 1875 the head constable, Parker Butcher, did attempt to halt proceedings but was deposited into a burning boat instead. By the 20th century the event became largely lawful, with the grand procession, including floats, becoming known as a major feature from the 1950s.

In 1947 the bonfire event, as documented by Pathé News, featured a large bonfire and a finale with fireworks. Since the 1950s the procession has featured Scorcher, a mechanical fire breathing dragon that is controlled by an operator sitting inside the chest area.

Following a cessation that began in the 1980s, the event was restarted in 1994 with comedian Spike Milligan, as "Rye Fawkes", lighting the bonfire. In both 2023 and 2024 the local train station was closed during the event, according to the train operator this was "for reasons of public safety". The 2024 event featured the usual parade route, Scorcher the dragon, fireworks, and an effigy of Guy Fawkes on top of the bonfire which satirised the government cuts to the winter fuel payment.

== Accolades ==
In 2024 the Daily Telegraph newspaper and the Country Living magazine both listed the Rye bonfire as one of the UK's best bonfire nights.

== See also ==
- Sussex Bonfire Societies
- Lewes Bonfire
