= Lewes Bonfire =

Annual celebration in Lewes, England

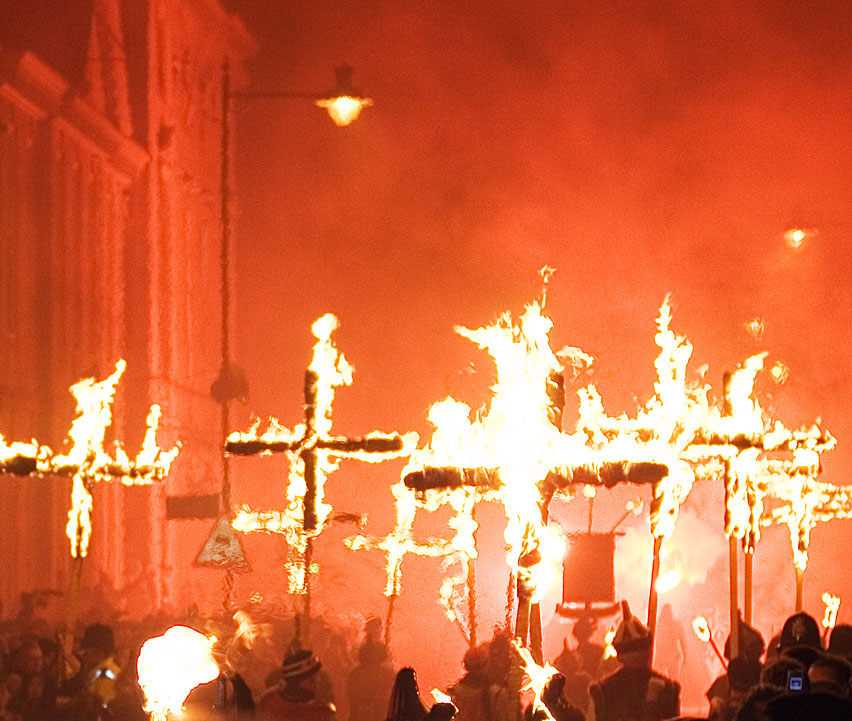
- Procession of the martyrs' crosses, as part of Lewes' Bonfire Night celebrations
- Status: active
- Frequency: annually
- Locations: Lewes, Sussex
- Attendance: c. 40,000 (2024)
- Website: www.lewesbonfirecelebrations.com

Lewes Bonfire is a set of celebrations held in the town of Lewes in Sussex, England, and the United Kingdom's largest Bonfire Night festivities, with Lewes being called the bonfire capital of the world.

Always held on 5 November (unless the 5th falls on a Sunday, in which case it is held on Saturday the 4th), the event not only marks Guy Fawkes Night – the date of the uncovering of the Gunpowder Plot in 1605 – but also commemorates the memory of the seventeen Protestant martyrs from the town burned at the stake for their faith during the Marian Persecutions.

Lewes is part of the Sussex bonfire tradition. There are seven societies putting on six separate processions and firework displays throughout Lewes on 5 November. As well as this, 25–30 societies from all around Sussex come to Lewes on the fifth to march the streets. This can result in up to 5,000 people taking part in the celebrations, and up to 80,000 spectators attending in the county market town with a population of just over 17,000.

== History ==
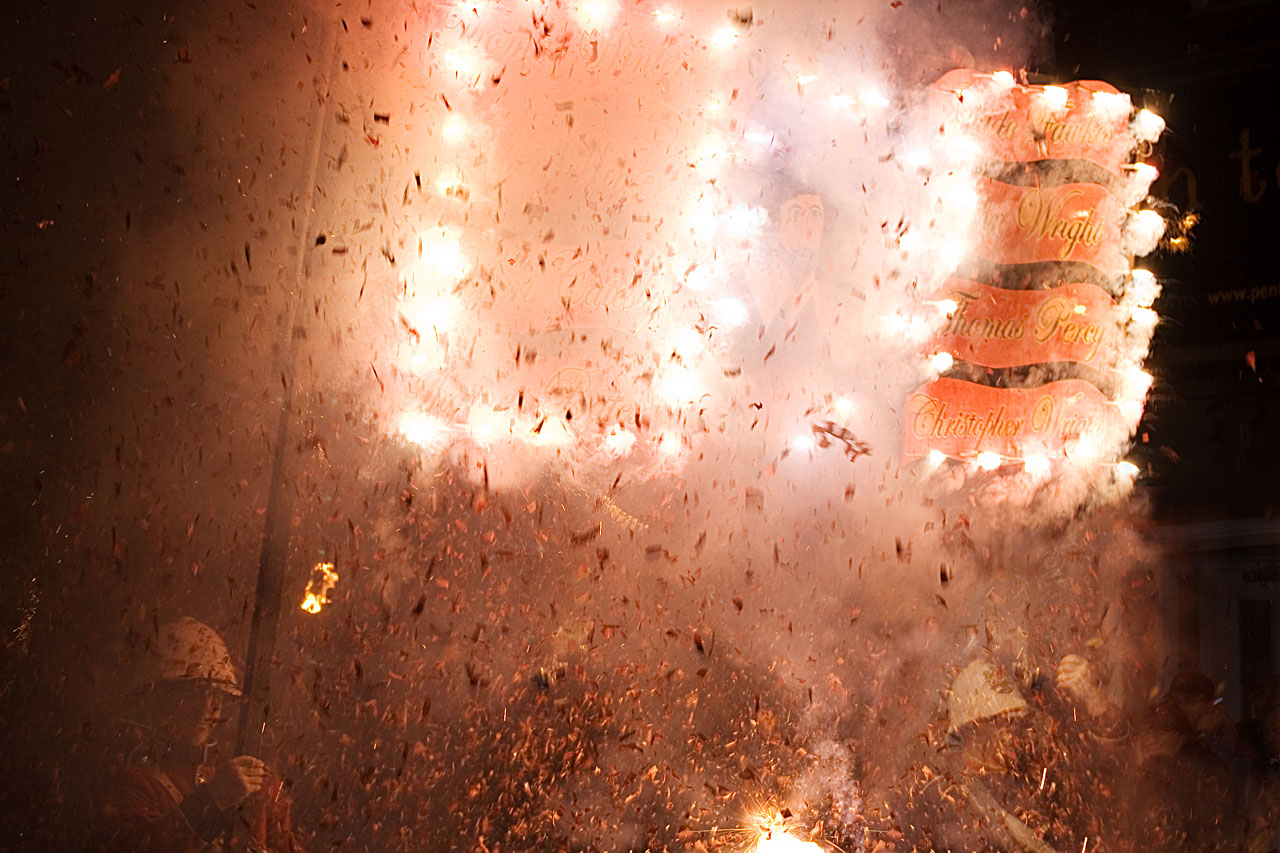
Colonial soldiers carry a banner, exploding with bangers, commemorating Guy Fawkes and his co-conspirators.

The history of bonfire celebrations on 5 November throughout the United Kingdom have their origins with the Gunpowder Plot of 1605, where a group of English Catholics, including the now infamous Guy Fawkes, were foiled in their plot to blow up the House of Lords.

The following January, an act entitled 'An Acte for a publique Thanksgiving to Almighty God ever year of the Fifth day of November' was passed, which held that 5 November should be held in perpetual remembrance of the plot, with a special service held in every Church of England parish church.

Celebrations in Lewes were not planned or carried out annually, but were more random events that more closely resembled riots. They continued until they were banned by Oliver Cromwell during the Commonwealth. However, they were reintroduced when King Charles II returned, but still on a random basis. Interest waned by the end of the 18th century but in the 1820s large groups of Bonfire Boys started celebrating with fireworks and large bonfires. The celebrations became rowdier and rowdier until 1847, when police forces were drafted in from London to sort out the Bonfire Boys. There were riots and fighting, and restrictions were clamped down on the celebrators, their locations moved to Wallands Park, at that time fields, not the suburb it is today. However, in 1850 they were allowed back to the High Streets. By this time the former riots had become much more like the processions carried out today. In 1853 the first two societies, Cliffe and Lewes Borough were founded, and most of the others were founded later in the same century. The cult of the Sussex martyrs was instigated at a time of the restoration of the Catholic hierarchy in England, bolstered by an increase in the Irish Catholic population, as well as the high-profile conversion to Catholicism of members of the Oxford movement, including Cardinal Newman and former Archdeacon of Chichester, Henry Edward Manning. In the mid 19th century the practice of burning an effigy of Pope Paul V at the Lewes Bonfire celebrations began. According to historian Jeremy Goring, "Paul V was a peaceable man who happened to be Pope at the time of the Gunpowder Plot in 1605 and who cannot be held responsible for the Gunpowder Plot or the persecution of Protestants in the reign of Mary I, which were linked at this time by a misunderstanding of the past." In 1893 William Richardson, rector of the Southover district of Lewes, held sermons on the Sunday before 5 November warning about the perils of Catholicism. Many attendees were members of the newly-formed Orange Lodge in Lewes.

There is a history of religious antagonism and anti-popery around the bonfire celebrations in Lewes. In the 1930s the mayor of Lewes requested that 'no popery' banners be removed and an end to the burning of effigies of Pope Paul V. In the 1950s the Cliffe Bonfire Society was banned from the Bonfire Council from taking part in the United Grand Procession for its refusal to stop carrying a 'no popery' banner and banners commemorating the 16th century Protestant martyrs burned at Lewes. In 1981 Ian Paisley visited Lewes on Bonfire Night and tried to fan the flames of conflict by handing out anti-Catholic pamphlets. His intervention back-fired and the following year he was burned in effigy. Today, anti-Catholic attitudes are rare and the militant Calvinism that continues in Northern Ireland is all but extinct in Lewes. In the 21st century, controversy continues to be associated around the Bonfire societies and competing definitions of tradition and bigotry. For instance, the burning in effigy of Pope Paul V was described in 2012 as "a scandalous piece of stone-cold bigotry". In 2017 the Lewes Borough Bonfire Society agreed to end the tradition of blackface and wearing skulls and horns as part of its Zulu costumes.

== Event ==
To mark the demise of the 17 Lewes Martyrs, 17 burning crosses are carried through the town, and a wreath-laying ceremony occurs at the War Memorial in the centre of town. Ladies' and men's races take place, pulling flaming tar barrels in a "barrel run", which takes place along Cliffe High Street at the start of the evening. A flaming tar barrel is then thrown into the River Ouse; this is said to symbolise the throwing of the magistrates into the river after they read the Riot Act to the bonfire boys in 1847. The festivities culminate in five separate bonfire displays.

A number of large effigies are drawn through the streets before being burned at the bonfires. Each year these include Guy Fawkes, as well as Pope Paul V, who became head of the Roman Catholic Church in 1605. In addition, each of the six main local societies creates a topical "tableau"(a large three-dimensional model packed with fireworks), and the Cliffe and Southover societies display on pikes the heads (also in effigy) of its current "Enemies of Bonfire", who range from nationally reviled figures to local officials who have attempted to place restrictions on the event. In 2001 effigies of Osama bin Laden were burned by the Cliffe, Commercial Square and Lewes Borough bonfire societies, causing the Lewes Bonfire to receive more press attention than usual, being featured on the front page of some national newspapers, as did the Firle Bonfire Society's 2003 choice of a gypsy caravan. In 2014 police investigated complaints about plans to burn two effigies of Alex Salmond, the First Minister of Scotland, and one model was subsequently withdrawn from the event. In 2015 effigies of David Cameron with a pig, Jeremy Clarkson and Sepp Blatter were burned.

The Daily Telegraph has described the night as "a head-on collision of Halloween and Mardi Gras". Up to 80,000 people have been known to attend this local spectacle, coming from all over the South and sometimes further afield. As the event has grown in recent years, the police presence on the night has increased to deal with the large crowds attracted to the event. The events are organised by each of the local bonfire societies in conjunction with Sussex Police, Surrey Police and East Sussex Fire & Rescue Service, SE Ambulance Service and St John Ambulance has treatment centres and ambulances around procession routes and bonfire sites to care for anyone who has been injured. In recent years, railway stations at Lewes, Falmer, Glynde and Southease have had planned closures for the duration of the event due to foreseeable overcrowding.

== Bonfire societies ==
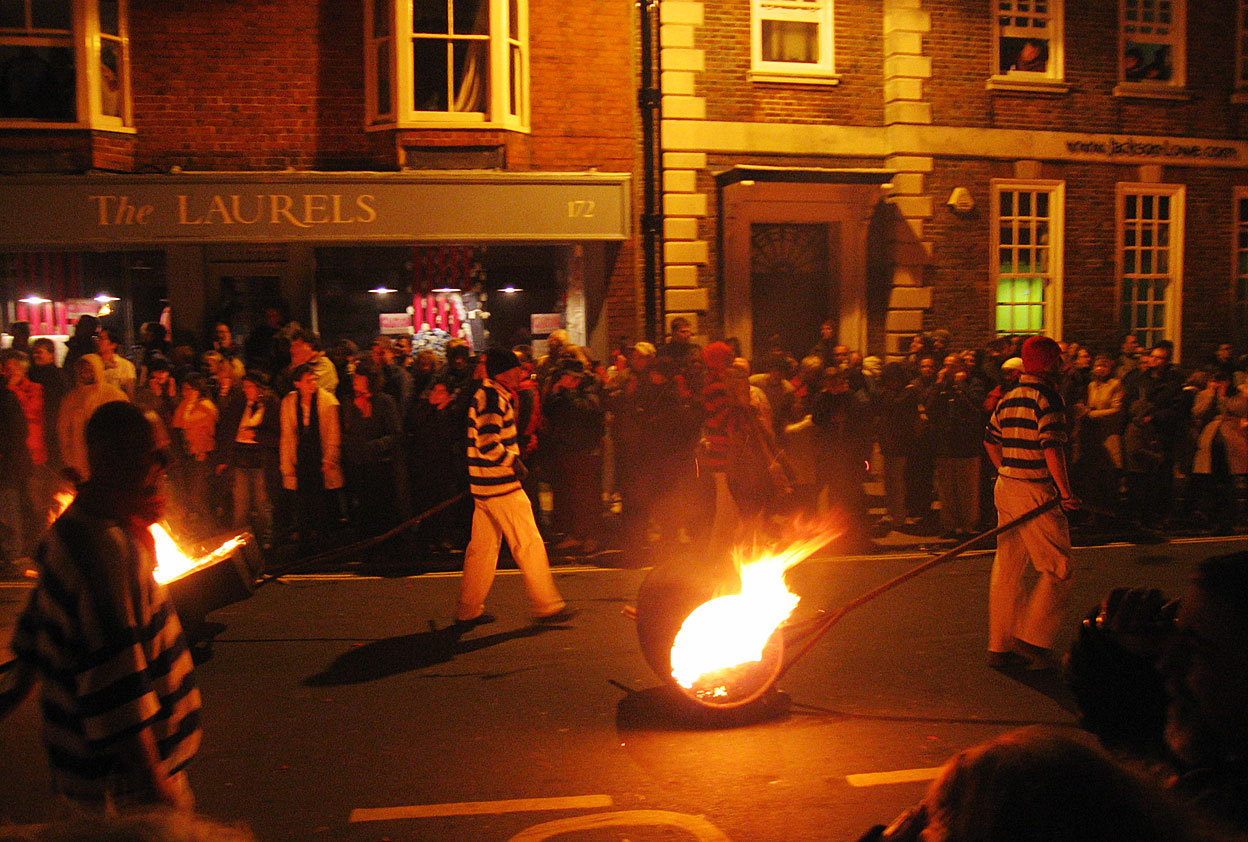
Lewes Borough Bonfire Society drag burning tar barrels through the streets of Lewes as part of the celebrations.

Lewes has seven bonfire societies. Other town's societies hold their own bonfire celebrations in the weeks leading up to November the Fifth, and each of the Lewes societies sends out parties to these "outmeetings" or "outfires" (the nomenclature varies between the societies) to march with the local society. On the Fifth, the Lewes societies process separately around their own particular areas, join for the main parade, then disperse to separate own fire site on the edge of the town, with bonfire, effigies and firework displays and effigies are burned.

Nearly all marchers carry torches, some ignite and drop bangers (locally called "rookies", short for rook scarers), and some carry burning crosses, banners, musical instruments or burning letters spelling out the initials of the society.

=== Cliffe ===
The Cliffe, founded in 1853, traditionally represents the Cliffe and Lansdown areas of Lewes (centred around Cliffe High Street), but recently they have also claimed the South Malling suburb with the addition of the "Malling Bonfire Society". Their smugglers' jumpers are black and white, and the pioneer fronts are Vikings and French Revolutionaries. The Dorset Arms is the society's headquarters, and the local church is St. Thomas à Becket's. Currently the only society to march under a "No Popery" banner and to continue in the tradition to "burn" (more accurately explode with fireworks) an effigy of Pope Paul V at Bonfire.

=== Commercial Square ===
Founded in 1855, they represent the St. John's area north of Lewes Castle, based on Commercial Square, where their headquarters, the Elephant and Castle pub is but the Brewers Arms in Lewes High Street is now their headquarters . The pioneers are Native Americans (this theme was picked after Lewesians visited the US in the 19th century and realised their hardships) and American Civil War soldiers, and the smugglers wear gold and black jumpers. The society also claims the Wallands Park and Landport suburbs. The local church is St John sub Castro.

=== Lewes Borough ===
Lewes Borough is the joint oldest society with Cliffe, formed in 1853. Until 1859 they were known as the 'Lewes Town Bonfire Society'. Borough's First Pioneer Group is that of the Celtic warrior and the Tudor era is the Society's Second Pioneer Group. Their jumpers are blue and white. In 1863 the famous Monster Iron Key of the Ancient Borough of Lewes weighing nearly a quarter hundredweight (over 12 kilos) was carried in the procession for the first time. The key is still in the Borough's processions and is a symbol that on 5 November the 'Borough Boys' are given the freedom of the streets of Lewes. Representing the western half of Lewes and located on Western Road, their headquarters is St. Mary's Social Club. The local church is St. Anne's.

=== Southover ===
Southover has roots in the mid-19th century but it disbanded in 1985, and then reformed in 2005. It represents the Cranedown and St. Pancras areas as well as the old village of Southover. Located on Southover High Street, the local church is St. John the Baptist's, where there is a war memorial, and the headquarters is The Swan Inn. Their guernseys are red and black and their pioneers are monks (representing the remains of the Priory of St. Pancras nearby) and buccaneers. Southover march with the British Imperial Marching Band and the Pentacle Drummers. Southover's firesite is at the Convent Field, behind Lewes Football Club.

=== South Street ===
South Street was formed in 1913 as a society for the children of members of the Cliffe; however, both Cliffe and South Street now accept members of all ages. Their jumpers are brown and cream, and their pioneers are (first) 18th-century Georgian (mid-18th century), (second) English Civil War (mid-17th century) soldiers and (third) Lewes Chalk Miners. They are based on South Street and the small area to the west between it and the River Ouse, and their headquarters is The Snowdrop, South Street. Their firesite is on the Railway Land.

=== Waterloo ===
Waterloo was reformed in 1954 and represents the area around Market Street, a quarter of Lewes with little population. Waterloo's jumpers are red and white and their pioneers are Mongols and Ancient Greeks and Romans. Their headquarters is the Royal Oak and their firesite is at Malling Recreation Ground.

=== Nevill Juvenile ===
Founded in 1967 specifically for children, Nevill has remained a juvenile society and represents the Nevill Estate. Their headquarters is St. Mary's Social Centre. They hold their celebrations a week or two before the 5th with help from the other societies. Their pioneers are Suffragettes, Valencians, Medieval, and British Military (1900–1950), and their jumpers are green and white.

== See also ==
- Culture of Sussex
- Guy Fawkes Night
- History of Christianity in Sussex
- Marian Persecutions
- Lewes Martyrs
- Richard Woodman
- We wunt be druv
- Rye Bonfire

== Bibliography ==
- Flint, John; Kelly, John (2013). Bigotry, Football and Scotland. Edinburgh University Press. ISBN 978-0748670390.
- Goring, Jeremy (2003). Burn Holy Fire: Religion in Lewes since the Reformation. James Clarke and Co. ISBN 978-0718830403.
