= Parkin (cake) =

Cake made from ginger, oats and treacle

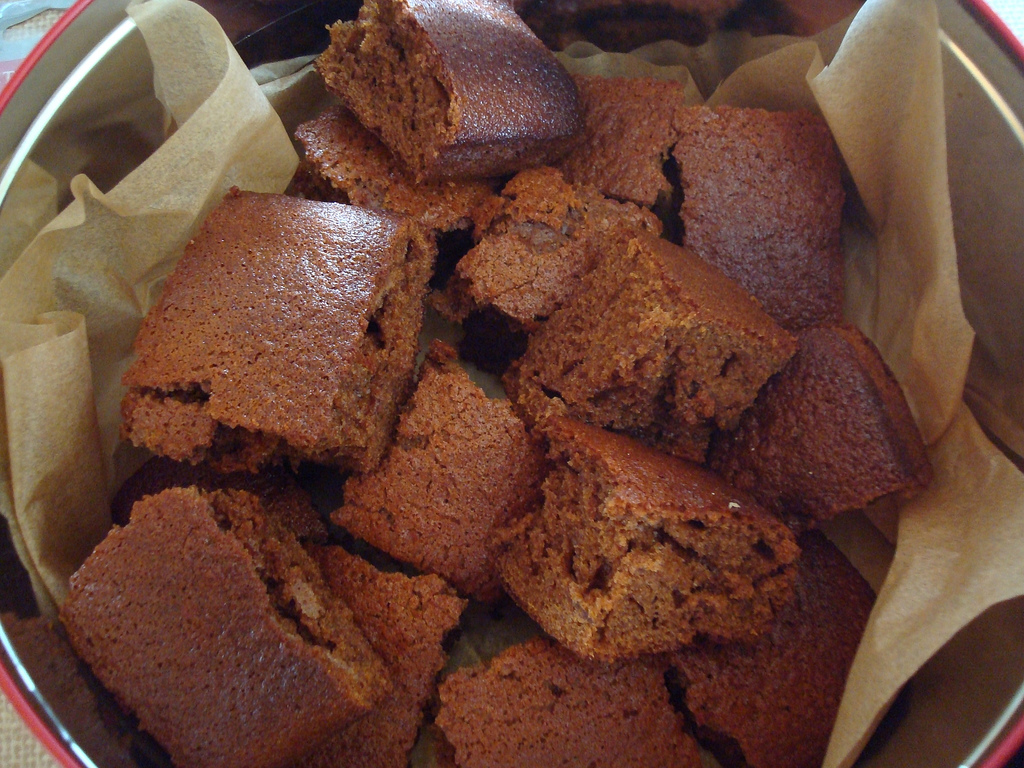
- Yorkshire parkin
- Place of origin: England
- Region or state: Northern England
- Main ingredients: Flour, oatmeal, molasses, ginger, lard or butter

Parkin is a gingerbread cake traditionally made with oatmeal and black treacle, which originated in Northern England. Often associated with Yorkshire, it is widespread and popular elsewhere, notably in Lancashire. Parkin is baked to a hard cake but with resting becomes moist and even sometimes sticky. There are regional differences; for example, in Hull and East Yorkshire, it has a drier, more biscuit-like texture than in other areas, whereas in Lancashire it is generally made with golden syrup rather than with the treacle used elsewhere. Parkin is traditionally eaten on Guy Fawkes Night, 5 November, and when celebrating "Yorkshire Day" on 1 August, and it is also enjoyed throughout the winter months. It is baked commercially throughout Yorkshire but is mainly a domestic product in other areas.

== Etymology ==
The origin of the word parkin is unknown. The first published dated reference to parkin was collected from 1728 from the West Riding of Yorkshire Quarter Sessions, when Anne Whittaker was accused of stealing oatmeal to make parkin. The Lancashire schoolmaster and poet Tim Bobbin describes tharf cake in 1740, and this is recognisable as a parkin. A possible older use of parkin is in the 17th-century ballad "The Song of Arthur O'Bradley", which purports to describe a merry wedding from the time of Robin Hood (14th century):

When Arthur, to make their hearts merry
Brought ales and parkin and perry.

The tharf cake is of ancient Teutonic origin, as tharf or theorf meant "unleavened, un-fermented, solid tough or sodden" in Old English. John Wycliffe in his translation of the Bible in 1389 (Mark Ch.14.v. 1) calls unleavened bread a "tharf loove". (Note: Pask and the feeste of therf looves was after the secunde day. (Mark Ch.14.v. 1))

== History ==
Parkin is not traditional in the south of England, as it was eaten in areas where oats, rather than wheat, were the staple grain for the poor. It is closely related to tharf cake—an unsweetened cake cooked on a griddle rather than baked. The traditional time of the year for tharf cakes to be made was directly after the oat harvest in the first week in November. For festive occasions, the cake would be sweetened with honey. In the seventeenth century (about 1650) sugar started to be imported from Barbados, (Note: Molasses had been imported from Sicily into England is small quantities since the late 13th century) and molasses was a by-product of the refining process. Molasses was first used by apothecaries; to make a medicine theriaca, from which name the word treacle is derived. As molasses, or treacle, as it was called at that time, became plentiful, it was substituted for honey in the preparation of tharf cakes.

In Northern Europe, honey was used as a medicine, for festive cakes and making mead; before 1750, sweetness was not a characteristic of everyday food. Honey cakes had a special festive significance. They were baked to be hard, but after storage for a couple of weeks they regained their moisture becoming soft and even sticky. Molasses has hygroscopic properties. German Lebkuchen and Pfefferkuchen were other examples of hygroscopic holiday gingerbreads. They too were baked hard in summer and allowed to moisten for consumption at Christmas.

Though parkin and tharf cake appear to be synonymous, all parkins generally were sweet tharf cakes.

=== Tharf cake ===
Parkin and tharf cake were used interchangeably in Lancashire and southern parts of Yorkshire until 1900. Over the 500 years the recipe and taste of these cakes have changed considerably. It was the food of the poor. Ovens were rare in the houses of the poor (hence Soda bread is baked over a fire), and they generally had no access to public bakers before the 1820s, so the cakes were cooked on griddles or bakestones on an open fire. The best parkin was made with fresh oatmeal, which fixes the date around the first week in November.

=== Festivities ===
In southern Lancashire, West and South Yorkshire, parkin is linked to the Guy Fawkes Night celebration. Jennifer Stead, in her study Prodigal Frugality, identifies the link between Guy Fawkes and parkin as the bonfire. The first two weeks in November had many Christian festivals, and like Celtic festivals that preceded them, they were celebrated with a fire and ritual cakes. November starts with All Hallows Eve, that runs into All Saints Day (1 November), which is followed by All Souls Day (2 November). Little Lent and the forty-day fast until Christmas, started at Martinmas. (11 November). On All Souls Day, soul cakes were baked. The Martinmas fair was important, being the traditional day when cattle were bought and sold, and servants were hired for the following year. It was also the date that cattle were slaughtered and salted to preserve them for the winter and for general feasting and dancing.

The Celtic festival of Samain, (Note: It is one of the four Gaelic seasonal festivals, Samhain, Imbolc, Beltane and Lughnasadh) the festival of the dead on 1 November, was celebrated with special cakes and bonfires. It was Christianised into All Hallows by the church in 837 AD, and the culinary tradition continued. In 1605, when Guy Fawkes gave the English church a reason to celebrate with a bonfire, the tradition was adopted under the new name, just four days later on 5 November. During the period of industrialisation, many traditional holidays were discontinued, but Guy Fawkes Night continued to be celebrated. In the 19th century (1862), parkin and treacle toffee with potatoes baked in the fire had become the traditional foods of Guy Fawkes Night, and in Leeds, 5 November became known as Parkin Night.

== Ingredients ==
The principal ingredients of a Yorkshire Parkin are oatmeal, flour, black treacle (similar to molasses), fat (traditionally lard, but modern recipes use butter, margarine or rapeseed oil), and ginger. Oatmeal and golden syrup are generally considered distinctive features of Lancashire parkin, whilst Yorkshire Parkin uses treacle and soft brown sugar.

The flour used in parkin in England is self-raising, containing a small amount of chemical leavening agent. If this is not available, or if the proportion of oatmeal is high, it is essential to add a leavening agent, e.g. baking powder or a mixture of sodium bicarbonate and cream of tartar.

One of the key features of parkin is that it retains its texture well. It is baked to be hard, but after storing in a sealed tin or box for several days, it becomes soft again, the texture that is intended.

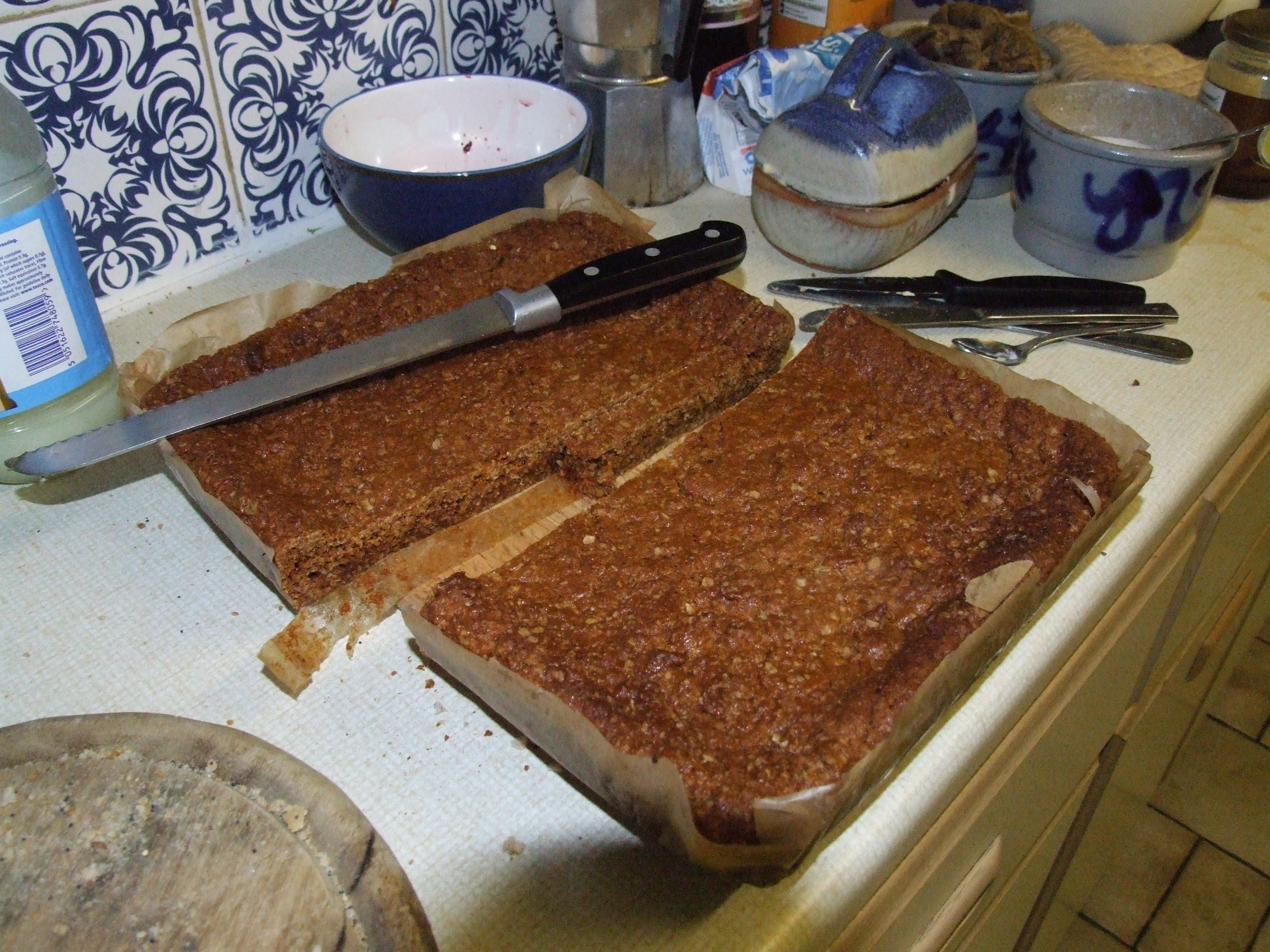
Lancashire Parkin straight from the oven

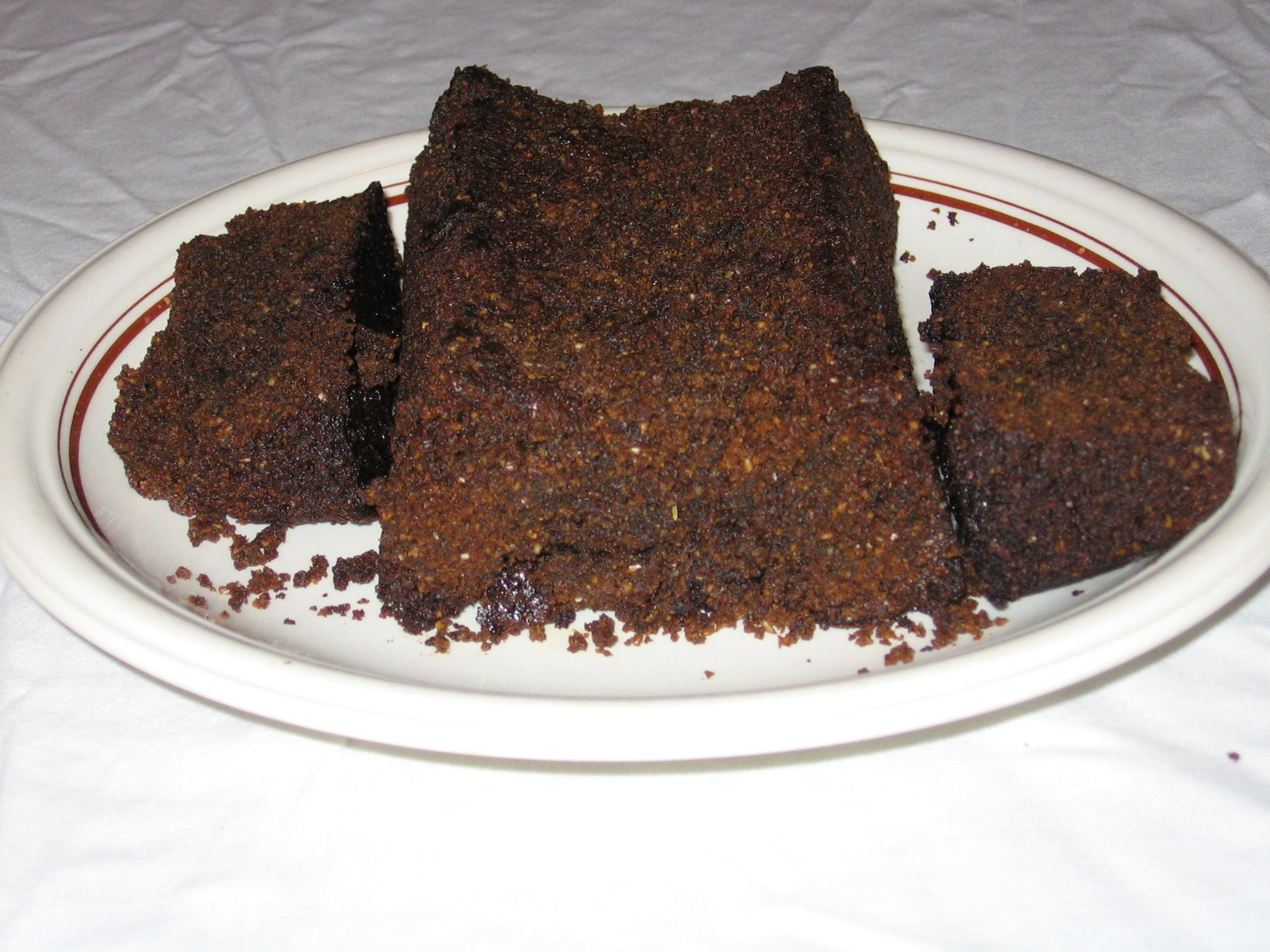
Using more treacle or brown sugar gives parkin a dark colour.

== See also ==
- Soul cake
- Flapjack (oat bar)
- List of English dishes
