= Sussex Bonfire Societies =

Society for bonfire festivals in Sussex

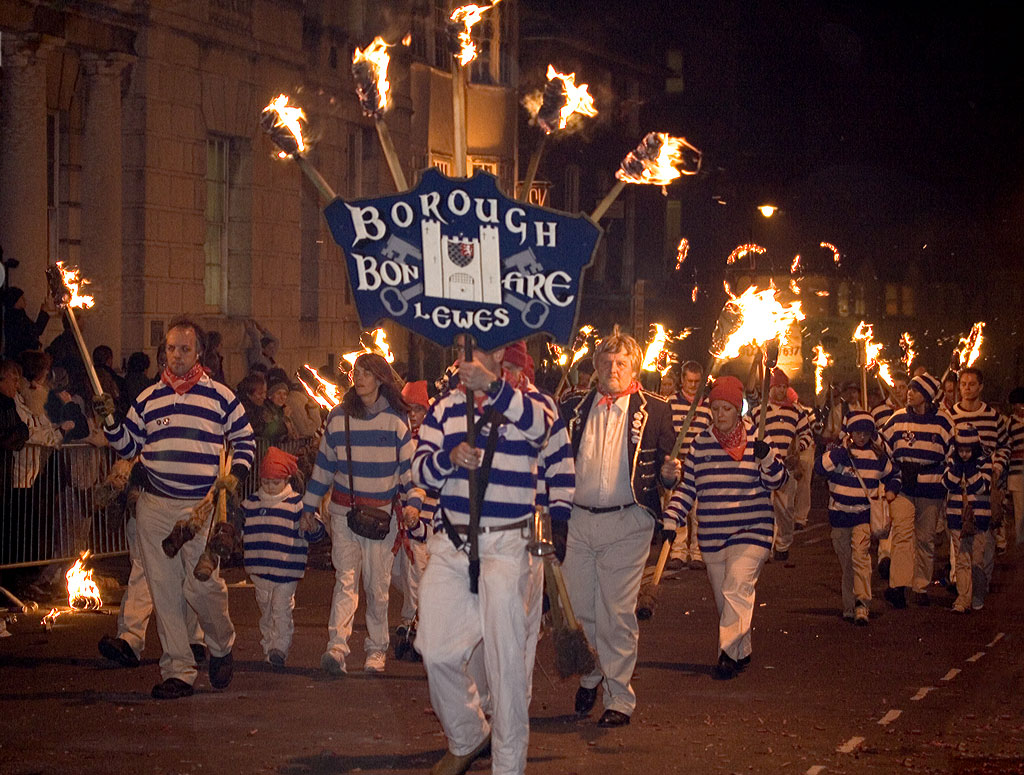
Members of the Lewes Borough Bonfire Society on Bonfire Night in Lewes, Sussex.

The Sussex Bonfire Societies are responsible for the series of bonfire festivals concentrated on central and eastern Sussex, with further festivals in parts of Surrey and Kent from September to November each year.

The Lewes celebrations, by far the largest and most well-attended event, mark both Guy Fawkes Night and the burning of 17 Protestant martyrs in Lewes's High Street from 1555 to 1557, during the reign of Mary Tudor.

== Development ==
The Sussex Bonfire tradition is a uniquely local form of protest with several influences under the motto We Burn For Good.

Whereas Guy Fawkes Night in most parts of Great Britain is traditionally commemorated at large public fireworks displays or small family bonfires, towns in Sussex and Kent hold huge gala events with fires, processions and festivals. The tradition has remained strong for more than a century becoming the highlight of the year for many towns and villages in the South East. The Bonfire Societies use the events to collect money for local charities.

Guy Fawkes Night was adopted by the early Lewes Bonfire gangs for convenience as this was the night that civil disobedience was tolerated when young men could let off steam which became riots. From the mid-18th century Guy Fawkes night celebrations began to take on an entirely different meaning as a rallying point to protest against authority. In 1785 the greatest riot perhaps ever known at Lewes began when a bonfire was started on School Hill in the centre of town.

Later many conscripted men returning from the Napoleonic Wars faced real hardship and added to this feeling of social injustice, forming themselves into gangs based around sea ports where they had connections and could operate with relative impunity. The French Marinière jumper was adopted as better equipment by the British sailors and as trophies of war. Additionally the Sailor suit was common dress for working-class people at the time because of its ready availability at ports and as counter-fashion for the working class. It also provided cover for the gangs to operate as you could hide in plain sight if other people are wearing the same thing. Different colour stripes differentiated the different gangs.

Later still the disenfranchised workers became increasingly politicised by radicals like Tom Paine, who lived in Lewes, and bonfire gangs or 'boys' began to organise, collecting subscriptions to finance them and building bonfires and burning effigies to show their dissent.

The radicals like Tom Paine began to form successful campaigns for political reform such as the Chartists and adopted lobbying and peaceful demonstration tactics and rejected those who continued with the street riots. Consequently there was a ban on assembly with burning torches and bonfires to quell the workers uprising. It was from this point that Guy Fawkes night became the special and local 'Bonfire' in Lewes as it adopted the right to have a bonfire and celebrate under the Observance of 5th November Act 1605.

The banning did not stop the Bonfire celebrations in Lewes and they spread to other parts of East Sussex in uprising. From 1827 the Bonfire Boys became more organised and darkened their faces to prevent arrest. From 1832 blazing tar barrels were rolled down the narrow streets of the commercial and wealthy centre of Lewes with timber buildings on either side, openly threatening life and property of the ruling classes.

The protests continued and in 1846 the local magistrate was knocked unconscious in a confrontation with Bonfire Boys as he emerged from his house to warn them of arrest. In "Observations on the Doings in Lewes of the 5th November 1846", printed anonymously in the Sussex Weekly Advertiser, called for the working class to be oppressed and the Bonfire Boys locked-up. The Tory press, particularly The Express Newspapers, suggested to compromise on free speech that the festivities be moved to a site out of town. The Bonfire Boys refused to negotiate with the authorities and pledged to continue their protests. In the middle of the night before the following 5 November a confrontation between some Bonfire Boys, rabble rousers and the local constabulary showed they were woefully outnumbered for what everyone thought was going to be the biggest and most riotous Bonfire night yet. The Lewes Police called-in re-enforcements from London and by the next day a Police line surrounded County Hall. There was a long stand-off and by nightfall mock battle commenced with fireworks being thrown and the Police pushing back the crowds. The magistrate and local landowner Henry Pelham, 3rd Earl of Chichester read the Riot Act on the steps of County Hall behind the Police line and the Police dispersed the crowds with violence. The next morning was eerily quiet but the Bonfire Boys were buoyed by being undefeated in taking on the London Police. That night the Bonfire Boys celebrated back on the streets of Lewes and similar Bonfire festivities spread to other places across East Sussex for the rest of November. So local Bonfire societies were born. The enemies of the uprising such as the Police, Courts and Sussex Advertiser were targeted for intimidation. In a prophetic report and with contrition the paper noted that 'it shouldn't be ordinarily termed a riot, but is the keeping up of tradition'. As proposed by the Express and to keep the tradition burning strong it was agreed by all in 1848 that Wallands Park become the site of the festivities.

However, in 1850 Lewes Bonfire festivities were influenced again. After the Roman Catholic Relief Act 1829 in 1850 the Pope restored Catholic bishops in England including the new Archbishop of Westminster. There was an enormous public backlash and the meaning of Guy Fawkes night took on new vigour. In fury the Bonfire Boys, never to be understated in their offence, burned an effigy of the Pope as well as Guy Fawkes, something that is unique to Lewes. New Bonfire Societies were formed where none existed and with an intensity not seen for a hundred years on numerous nights East Sussex burned with outrage with signs of No Popery Here. These signs were not connected with the No Popery march on Parliament. It was a phrase from history which had re-emerged, and whereas some local to Lewes may well have been in the Protestant association movement there is no evidence that the Bonfire Societies were involved, indeed they weren't created until a long time after. It is more likely to have been a sign to provoke others into joining them in general protest against authority, in this case and with irony, against Parliament which Guy Fawkes had tried to blow-up.

With the history of the Gordon Riots still in the mind of the authorities, the Police decided that 'forebearance on the part of the authorities is the better policy’. And so in Lewes, with the authorities grudgingly accepting it and the Police just watching, the Bonfire Boys marked the spot where the Lewes Martyrs had been burnt at the stake and marched with burning crosses to increase their notoriety and as a snub to the liberal elite. Out of this the tradition we know today was born and tacit permission was granted to make it a local custom so Lewes man could assert their liberties, whether as a Protestant under a Catholic throne or to protest authority, and as a protest for social justice and over inequalities. Later Mark Antony Lower, an anti-Catholic propagandist and schoolmaster from Lewes, tried to hijack the notoriety of the Lewes Bonfire Boys incorporating the Lewes Protestant Martyrs into their festivities for his own gain.

Some assert there is a Pagan connection with Bonfire. But apart from fire as one of Pagans five elements there is no evidence of any link. The fire in the case of Bonfire was because of the trades of the original Bonfire Boys as smiths (see forge). Furthermore Paganism had become remote from most people from the early 18th century as towns industrialised and ways of life changed from working with seasons to working weeks. The Pagan revival of the early 20th century has seen Paganism co-opted into Bonfire.

== Organisation ==
The logistical set up required for the events often starts as early as February. This has led the Societies to pool resources and work together on each other's bonfire events. This creates associated processions, with large festivals like Lewes and Hastings going on late into the night. Due to the size and number of events and mutual collaboration, it became impractical to hold all the bonfires on the traditional Fifth of November. This resulted in the "bonfire season" to be extended over three months through September, October and November.

The first Sussex Bonfire Societies' event starts with the Uckfield Carnival on the first Saturday of September and (as at 2026) concludes with the Barcombe, Robertsbridge and Chiddingly festivals on the third Saturday of November. Each society that holds an event will invite a number of other bonfire societies to participate in its torchlit procession.

Although most Sussex Bonfire events are themed around the Gunpowder Plot and Guy Fawkes not all are. The Mayfield bonfire celebrations commemorate four Protestant martyrs that were burnt to death in the village, on a site opposite the current Colkins Mill Church in Station Road, on 24 September 1556. A stone monument to the Martyrs stands on the pavement outside the church grounds. Mayfield's torchlit procession and carnival takes place on the third Saturday in September (this being the nearest to 24 September) and it is widely considered to be the second largest torchlit procession (after Lewes) in terms of the number of participants (typically between 800 and 1,000 people participate in the procession). Four burning crosses are carried in the procession in memory of those martyred in the village in 1556. Another example is East Hoathly & Halland Carnival Society, whose event has a theme of military remembrance. It is held each year on the day before Remembrance Sunday and, unsurprisingly, the motto of EH&HCS is 'LEST WE FORGET'. The society has its roots in the celebrations that were held in East Hoathly on 11 November 1918 following the signing of the Armistice that brought the First World War to an end.

Societies and processions can be broadly grouped into two main categories: Carnival and Bonfire. Typically, but not exclusively, certain characteristics apply to each group. Carnival societies generally hold more family-oriented evenings where people turn out to have fun and make merry with music and laughter. It is usually forbidden for fireworks to be ignited within the procession. Bonfire Societies, on the other hand, hold events that are often less family-oriented; typically featuring more drinking and debauchment with small fireworks (e.g. 'rookies' aka rook scarers) being liberally used by participants in the torchlit procession. Some bonfire events feature what is known as a 'clergy stand' where a member of the host society will dress as a senior Christian cleric (such as The Pope, a Cardinal or a Bishop), stand on a raised platform and then read a sermon whilst having lit rookies thrown at them. Two other members of the host society, dressed as subordinate clerics, are allowed to accompany the senior cleric on the stand and try to fend off the rookies with implements such as a lit torch or a cricket bat. This usually occurs before the bonfire is lit and the fireworks display takes place.

== List of Bonfire Societies ==
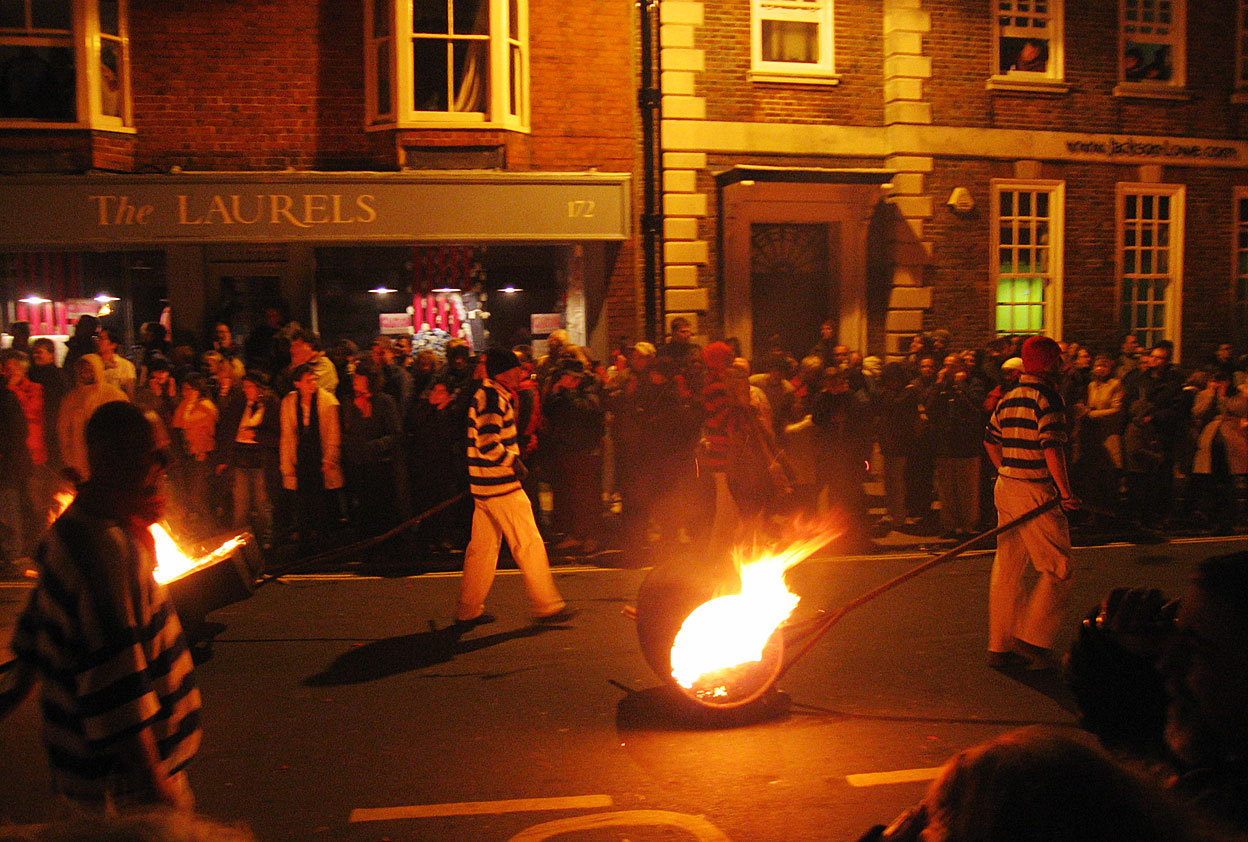
Members of the Cliffe Bonfire Society drag burning tar barrels through the streets of Lewes as part of their Bonfire Night celebrations.

- Lewes – for more on these societies see Lewes Bonfire.
  - Cliffe Bonfire Society
  - Commercial Square Bonfire Society
  - Lewes Borough Bonfire Society
  - Nevill Juvenile Bonfire Society
  - South Street Bonfire Society
  - Southover Bonfire Society
  - Waterloo Bonfire Society
- Barcombe Bonfire Society
- Battle (Battel Bonfire Boyes)
- Bexhill Bonfire Society
- Burgess Hill Bonfire Society
- Buxted Bonfire Society
- Chailey Bonfire Society
- Chiddingfold Bonfire (Surrey)
- Chiddingly Parish Bonfire Society
- Cowbeech Bonfire Society
- Crowborough Bonfire & Carnival Society
- Cuckfield Bonfire Society
- East Grinstead Community Bonfire (re-established 2022)
- East Hoathly & Halland Bonfire & Carnival Society
- Eastbourne Bonfire Society
- Edenbridge Bonfire Society (Kent)
- Ewhurst & Staplecross Bonfire Society
- Firle Bonfire Society
- Fletching Bonfire Society
- Hailsham Bonfire Society
- Hastings Borough Bonfire Society
- Hawkhurst Gang Bonfire Society (dissolved in 2024)
- Heathfield and District Bonfire Society
- Icklesham (Robin Hood Bonfire Society)
- Isfield and Little Horsted Bonfire Society
- Lindfield Bonfire Society
- Littlehampton Bonfire Society
- Maresfield Bonfire Society
- Mayfield Bonfire Society (Mayfield Bonfire Boyes and Belles)
- Meeching and District Bonfire Society
- Newick Bonfire Society
- Ninfield Bonfire Society
- Northiam Bonfire Society
- Robertsbridge Bonfire Society
- Rotherfield & Mark Cross Bonfire Society
- Rye & District Bonfire Society
- Seaford Bonfire Society
- Shoreham-by-Sea Bonfire Society
- South Heighton Bonfire Society
- Uckfield Bonfire & Carnival Society
- Vines Cross Bonfire Society
- Whatlington Renegades
- Who The Devil Are We Society(a travelling society without fixed location)
- Worthing Bonfire Society

== Defunct Bonfire Societies ==
- Arundel Bonfire Boys Society
- Bognor Bonfire Society
- Brighton
  - Brighton Borough Bonfire Society
  - Brighton Bonfire Boys
- Chichester Bonfire Society
- Clapham and Patching Bonfire Club
- Crawley Bonfire society
- Eastbourne Old Town & Meads (boys) and Upperton & Southfields (girls) Bonfire Societies (circa 1980s) based at The Lamb in Eastbourne and incorporated with Waterloo BS and Commercial Square BS at The Lamb in Lewes
- Five Ashes Bonfire Society
- Herstmonceux (The Merrie Harriers, superseded by the Cowbeech Bonfire Society)
- Hooe Bonfire Society
- Horsham Bonfire Society
- Lewes
  - Town Bonfire Society
  - Landport Bonfire Society
  - St Anne's Bonfire Society
- Newhaven
  - Society based at the Blacksmiths Arms pub
  - Society based at the Jolly Sailor pub
  - Newhaven Carnival Society (which replaced the former two in 1902)
  - Frog and Duck Bonfire Society (Newhaven)
- Ridgewood Bonfire Society (Uckfield)
- Shoreham Bonfire Boys

== See also ==
- Culture of Sussex
- Guy Fawkes Night
- Jack in the green
- Lewes Bonfire
- History of Christianity in Sussex
- Marian Persecutions
- Richard Woodman
- We wunt be druv

== Bibliography ==
- Dimmock, Matthew; Quinn, Paul; Hadfield, Andrew (2013). Art, Literature and Religion in Early Modern Sussex. Ashgate Publishing. ISBN 978-1472405227.
