= Walker's Nonsuch =

English toffee maker

Walker’s Nonsuch Ltd.
- Industry: confectionery
- Founded: 1894; 132 years ago
- Founder: Edward Joseph Walker and his son Edward Victor Walker
- Headquarters: Longton, Stoke-on-Trent, England, United Kingdom
- Area served: Worldwide
- Website: http://www.walkers-nonsuch.co.uk

Walker's Nonsuch Ltd. is a manufacturer of toffee based in Longton, Stoke-on-Trent, England, United Kingdom. It was founded in 1894 by Edward Joseph Walker and his son Edward Victor Walker.

== See also ==
- Toffee hammer
