= Toffee hammer =

Small hammer designed for breaking toffee

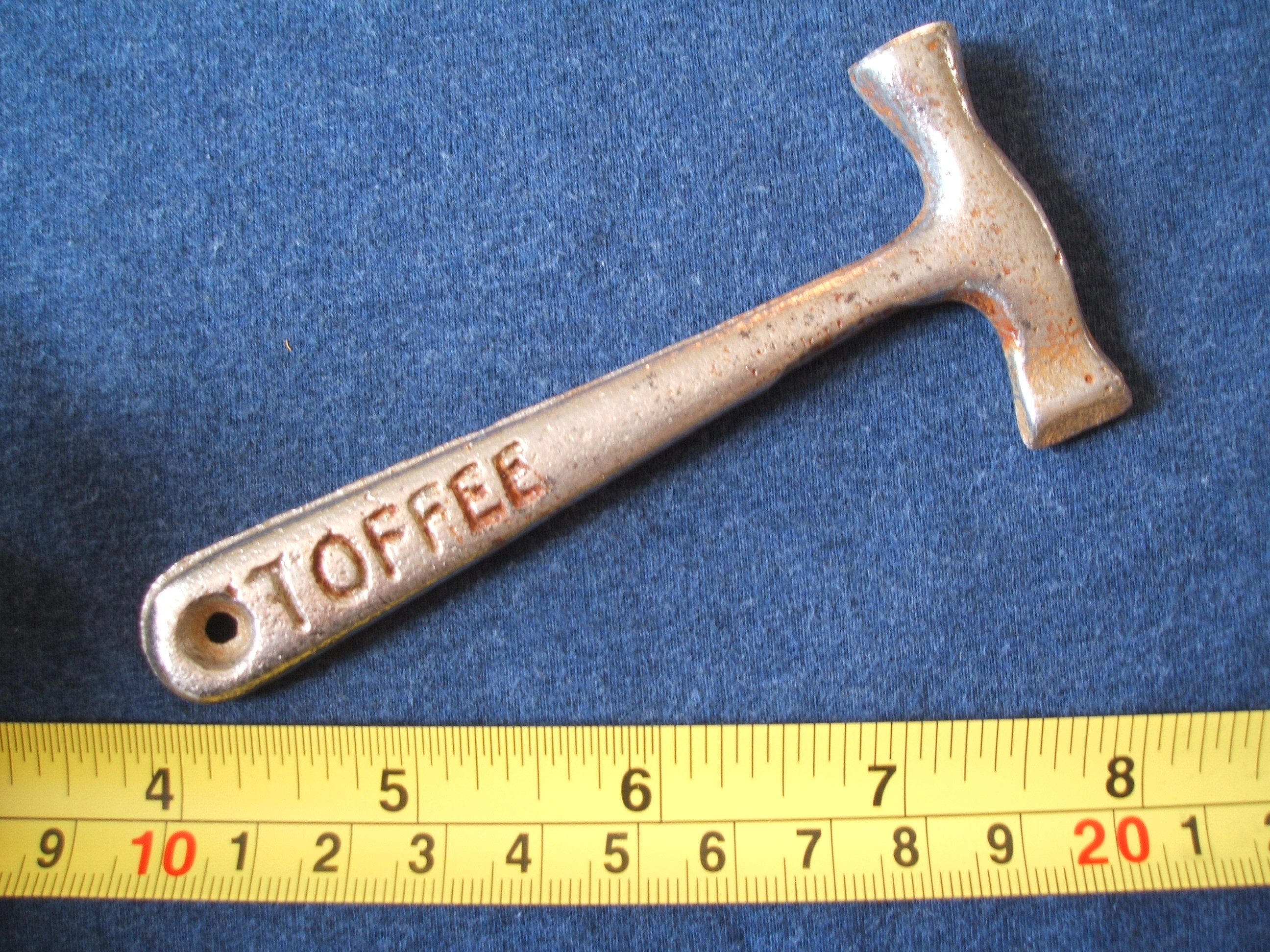
Walkers' Nonsuch toffee hammer

A toffee hammer is a very small hammer designed for breaking up sheets or slabs of hard toffee, such as bonfire toffee, into small pieces suitable for consumption. A toffee hammer is sometimes included as a novelty item in gift packs produced by toffee manufacturers.

Toffee hammers were used by suffragettes, in particular members of the Women's Social and Political Union, for breaking windows as a form of protest during their campaign for votes for women.

The term toffee hammer may also be used to refer to any unusually small hammer, for example in orthopedic surgery, or to a scaffolder's tool that resembles a toffee hammer.
