= Bonfire toffee =

Type of toffee

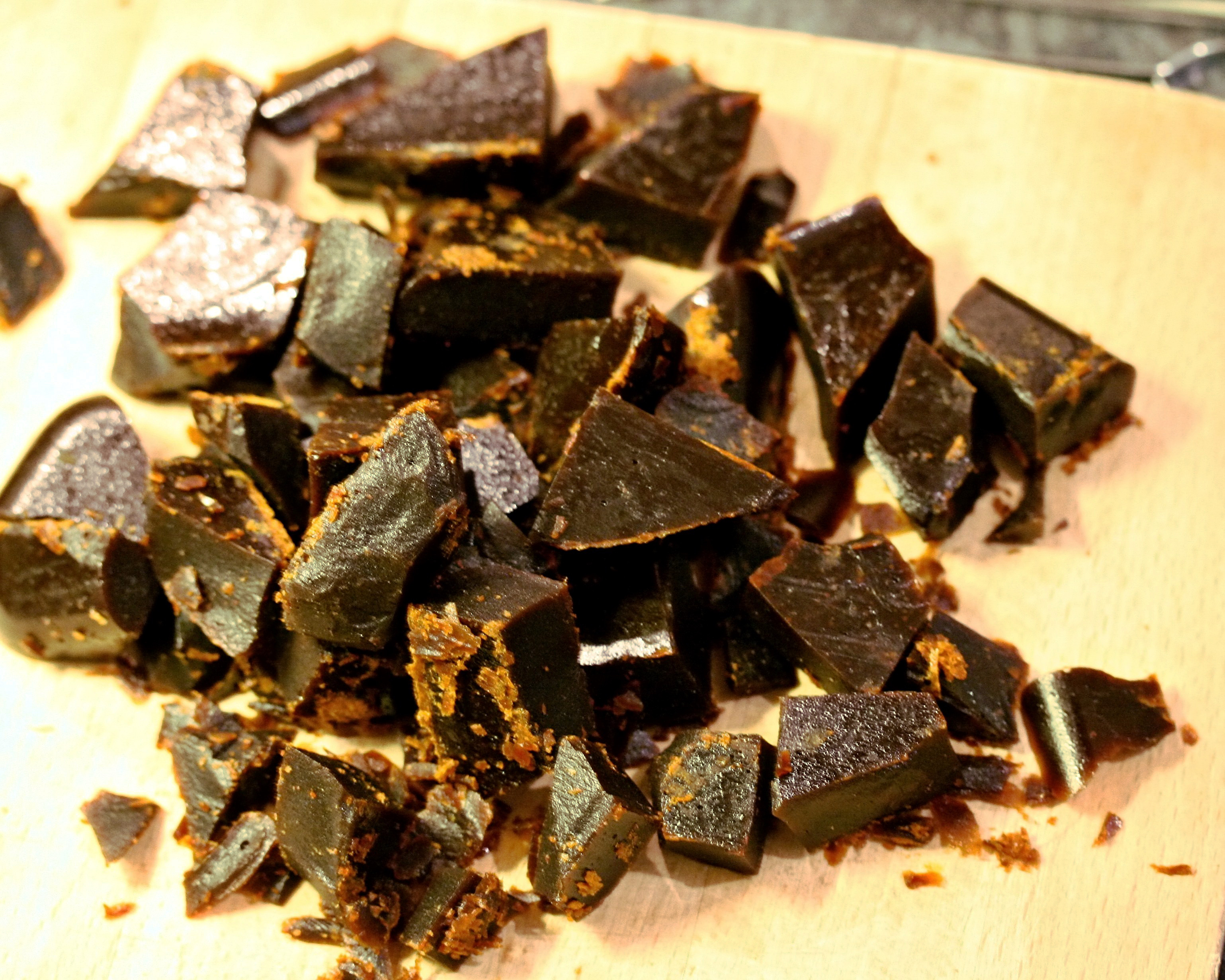
- Alternative names: Treacle toffee, plot toffee, Tom Trot, claggum, clack
- Type: Toffee
- Place of origin: United Kingdom
- Main ingredients: Butter or margarine, molasses, sugar

Bonfire toffee (also known as treacle toffee, Plot toffee, or Tom Trot) is a hard, brittle toffee associated with Halloween and Guy Fawkes Night (also known as "Bonfire Night") in the United Kingdom. The toffee tastes very strongly of black treacle (molasses), and cheap versions can be quite bitter. In Scotland, the treat is known as claggum, with less sweet versions known as clack. In Wales, it is known as loshin du (losin du or taffi triog).

== History ==
The use of treacle (or molasses) in the United Kingdom began in the 1660s, when it was first used to make gingerbread. Bonfire toffee emerged soon thereafter. However, treacle was considered medicinal at the time, and was therefore very expensive, limiting the spread of toffee as a dessert or snack food. The term "toffee" did not appear in print until 1825 although foods were often cooked several decades before their names or recipes for them appeared in print. Toffee developed in northern England some decades earlier (perhaps by the mid-18th century), and had displaced formerly popular sweets such as candied fruit, fruit preserves, marmalade, and similar items. Toffee was widely popular by 1800. At this time, toffee took many forms, including a soft version much like taffy, and was often called "toughy" or "tuffy". It was also known as "treacle sweetmeat", the suffix "-meat" having the meaning of any food. However, it is not entirely clear as to why it became associated with Guy Fawkes Night.

From about 1830 to 1900, bonfire toffee was quite popular in Yorkshire. In the 1890s, it was sometimes called "Tom Trot". Bonfire toffee was usually a homemade confectionery. Although industrial manufacturing of confectionery had begun in the 1840s, the price of black treacle in the 1890s and first decade of the 20th century often rose above the price of sugar which made store-bought toffee too expensive for many. Even in the 1960s, it was common for older people in a neighbourhood to make bonfire toffee to hand out to children on Guy Fawkes Night.

By the mid-1950s, bonfire toffee was often made in large sheets and pieces broken off with a toffee hammer. This practice was discouraged by some due to concerns about food safety. Treacle toffee was once common in sweet shops, but in the late 20th century was usually only available in supermarkets in October and November. However, it is still available year-round in speciality sweet shops, where it is usually broken by hand and wrapped in paper. It may be purchased as a sort of lollipop, on a stick with the foil dish it was made in still attached, or in sheets for breaking up and consuming at home.

Bonfire toffee is primarily consumed in the northern part of the United Kingdom, where sweets darker in colour are preferred.

Although bonfire toffee is usually considered a Halloween or Guy Fawkes Night treat, it has a Christmas association as well. In Wales, an old tradition exists of plygain, a Christian worship service held between 3:00– 6:00 a.m. in which Christmas carols are sung (and sometimes, but not always, accompanied by holy communion). After plygain was over, people would stay awake to decorate the house, play cards, eat cake or pikelets (a variation of the crumpet), or make bonfire toffee.

== Ingredients ==
The ingredients often include butter or margarine, black treacle, sugar, and sometimes white vinegar. The treacle is the critical ingredient, for it is less sweet than sugar and has a slightly bitter flavour that gives bonfire toffee its unique taste. One recipe calls for 230 grams (0.5 lb) of butter, 230 grams (0.5 lb) of treacle, and 450 grams (1.0 lb) of brown sugar. The mixture is cooked over medium heat until melted, and allowed to boil (being constantly, rapidly stirred) for 15 minutes. The hot mixture is then poured into buttered forms (such as a cake pan or special forms). Recipes calling for the use of vinegar vary these ingredients. For example, one recipe from 1922 calls for 550 grams (1.21 lb) of dark brown sugar, 280 millilitres (10 imp fl oz; 9 US fl oz) of treacle, one tablespoon (15 millilitres; 0.53 imp fl oz) of vinegar, one tablespoon (15 millilitres; 0.53 imp fl oz) of butter, and one teaspoon (5 millilitres; 0.18 imp fl oz) of sodium bicarbonate (or baking soda). White vinegar gives the toffee a slightly sharper taste, and alters the chemistry of the toffee so that it is not so brittle. It also helps the toffee to set. Other recipes call for about 2.8 litres (5 imp pt) of water, and vary the amount of the other ingredients. Some recipes call for the use of golden syrup instead of treacle.

It can be cut or rolled into sticks while still warm. Some recipes call for essence of almond, lemon, or peppermint to be added for flavour, or for cayenne pepper to be added to give it a spicy kick.

Generally speaking, little fat is used in the mixture, and the moisture content of the food is low. Food colouring (usually dark brown or black colour) is used in cheaper versions, when not enough treacle is present in the mixture to turn the toffee a dark colour.

By one estimate, 100 grams (3.5 oz) of bonfire toffee has 500 kilojoules (119 kcal), 4.3 grams (0.15 oz) of protein, 21.2 grams (0.75 oz) of carbohydrates, 1.9 grams (0.067 oz) of fat, and 0 grams (0 oz) of dietary fibre.

== Bibliography ==
- Barer-Stein, Thelma. You Eat What You Are: People, Culture and Food. Buffalo, N.Y.: Firefly Books, 1999.
- Benning, Lee Edwards. Oh, Fudge!: A Celebration of America's Favorite Candy. New York: Henry Holt, 1990.
- British Red Cross Society. The Ghana Cookery Book. London: Jeppestown Press, 2007.
- Butterworth, Robert. The Detour: Towards Revising Catholicism. Leominster, Herefordshire, U.K.: Gracewing, 2005.
- Davidson, Alan; Davidson, Jane; and Saberi, Helen. The Oxford Companion to Food. Oxford, England: Oxford University Press, 2006.
- Edwards, W.P. The Science of Sugar Confectionery. Cambridge, U.K.: Royal Society of Chemistry, 2000.
- Freeman, Bobby. First Catch Your Peacock: Her Classic Guide to Welsh Food. Talybont, Ceredigion, Wales, U.K.: Y Lolfa, 1996.
- Griffiths, Bill. A Dictionary of North East Dialect. Newcastle upon Tyne, U.K.: Northumbria University Press, 2005.
- Hess, Karen. Martha Washington's Booke of Cookery and Booke of Sweetmeats. Rev. ed. New York: Columbia University Press, 1995.
- Hutchings, John B. Food Color and Appearance. Gaithersburg, Md.: Aspen Publishers, 1999.
- Ingre, Sebastine. The Illustrated Dictionary of Health and Nutrition. Twin Lakes, Wisc.: Lotus Press, 2007.
- Jackson, E.B. Sugar Confectionery Manufacture. Gaithersburg, Md.: Aspen Publishers, 1999.
- Kellow, Juliette and Walton, Rebecca. The Calorie, Carb and Fat Bible 2007: The UK's Most Comprehensive Calorie Counter. Peterborough, Cambridgeshire, U.K.: Weight Loss Resources, 2007.
- Macleod, Iseabail. Scots Thesaurus. Edinburgh: Polygon at Edinburgh, 1999.
- Mason, Laura. Food Culture in Great Britain. Westport, Conn.: Greenwood Press, 2004.
- Mason, Laura. Sugar-Plums and Sherbet: The Prehistory of Sweets. Totnes, Devon, England: Prospect, 2004.
- O'Malley, Brendan. A Celtic Primer: A Complete Celtic Worship Resource and Collection. London: Canterbury Press, 2002.
- Rattray, M. E. Sweetmeat-Making at Home. London: C. Arthur Pearson, 1922.
- Richardson, Tim. Sweets: A History of Temptation. London: Bantam, 2002.
- Smith, Allison E. Ageing in Urban Neighbourhoods: Place Attachment and Social Exclusion. Bristol, U.K.: Policy, 2009.
