= List of windmills in East Sussex =

Extant and former windmills in East Sussex.
1 Alfriston, 2 Battle, 3 Cross in Hand, 4 Crowborough, 5 Glynde, 6 Herstmonceux, 7 Icklesham, 8 Kingston, 9 Mark Cross, 10 Mayfield, 11 North Chailey, 12 Nutley, 13 Patcham, 14 Polegate, 15 Punnetts Town, 16 Rottingdean, 17 Rye, 18 Stone Cross, 19 West Blatchington, 20 Westham 21 Winchelsea

A list of all windmills and windmill sites which lie in the current ceremonial county of East Sussex.

== Locations ==
=== A - B ===
Location	Name of mill and grid reference	Type	Maps	First mention or built	Last mention or demise	Photograph
Alfriston	Alfriston Mill; TQ 518 027	Tower		1834	Windmill World	
Arlington	Windover Mill	Post		c. 1800	Burnt down c. 1881	
Baldslow	Hayward's Mill	Post			Demolished 1855	
Baldslow	The Harrow Mill	Smock		1855		
Barcombe		Post		c. 1818	Burnt down c. 1907	
Battle	King's Head Mill	Post			Demolished 1805	
Battle	King's Head Mill; Caldbec Hill Mill; TQ 748 166	Smock		1805	Windmill World	
Battle	Telham Hill Mill	Post		1747	Demolished 1962	
Battle	Watch Oak Mill; Netherfield Mill		1813			
Beckley	Old Mill		1724	1724	1724	
Beckley	New Mill					
Beddingham	Old Mill		1724; 1813	1724	1813	
Berwick		Post	1724	1724	1724	
Bexhill	Mount Idle Mill					
Bexhill	Black Mill					
Bexhill	Down Mill; Hoad's Mill; TQ 733 087	Post		1784	Collapsed during storm 30 July 1965, demolished 31 July 1965. Information and photographs	
Bishopstone	Tide Mills	Smock		1860s	1883	
Bishopstone		Post				
Brede		Post	1813	1794	1905	
Brightling	Beacon Mill					
Brighton	Brighthelmstone Mill (north)	Post		1545	Blown down 1703	
Brighton	Brighthelmstone Mill (south)	Post		1545	Blown down 1703	
Brighton	Church Hill Mill	Post	1724	1724	Blown down 10 May 1726	
Brighton	Coffee Mill, East Street	Post		1736	1736	
Brighton	West Mill, Belle Vue Fields; Regency Square Mill	Post		1744	Moved to Preston 28 March 1797	
Brighton	West Street Mill			1744	1750, Possibly moved to Black Rock	
Brighton	East Brighton, Lewes Crescent			1793	1795, possibly moved (East End Mill)	
Brighton	East End Mill	Post		1800	1842, moved to Sudeley Place by 1847	
Brighton	Black Rock Mill; Roedean Mill			c. 1750	c. 1790	
Brighton	Sudeley Place Mill; East Mill	Post		1790s	Moved to Windmill St (Taylor's Mill) mid1840s	
Brighton	Vine's Mill; Clifton Gardens Mill	Post		1810	Moved to Windmill Street c. 1837	
Brighton	Toronto Terrace Mill; Albion Hill Mill; Brighton Park Mill; Butcher's Mill	Post		1822	Moved to Falmer (Race Hill) December 1861	
Brighton	Windmill Street; Clifton Mill	Post		c. 1837	Demolished c. 1862	
Brighton	Windmill Street; Taylor's Mill; East End Mill			1847	Collapsed 24 March 1862 whilst being prepared for move to new site at Woodingdean	
Brighton	Preston Mill; Streeter's Mill; Black Mill; Trusler's Mill	Post		1797	Demolished c. 1890	
Brighton	Lashmar's Old Mill; Hove Mill	Post		1780	Demolished 1821	
Brighton	Lashmar's New Mill	Post		1821	Moved to Clayton, 1852	
Brighton	Port Hall Mill	Post		1826	Demolished c. 1882	
Brighton	Bear Mill	Post		1813	Standing 1903	
Brighton	Site later occupied by Hanover Mill			1813	1813	
Brighton	Hanover Mill	Post		1838	Demolished c. 1887	
Brighton	Rose Hill Mill; Roundhill Mill; Cutress's Mill	Tower		c. 1834	Demolition commenced 13 March 1913, completed by 25 April 1913	
Brighton	Black Mill; Hodson's Mill; West Hill Mill	Smock		1808	Demolished 25 June 1866	
Burwash	Witherenden Mill					
Burwash	Rockhill Mill	Post		1839	Collapsed 1940	

=== C ===
Location	Name of mill and grid reference	Type	Maps	First mention or built	Last mention or demise	Photograph
Catsfield	Catsfield Mill	Post				
Chailey	TQ 386 214	Post		1596	Six mills in succession, on same site as Heritage mill	
Chailey	Heritage Mill; TQ 386 214	Smock			Windmill World	
Chailey	South Common Mill	Smock; TQ 387 175	1823	c. 1808	Standing 1922; Windmill World	
Chailey	Yokehurst Mill		1813	1790	Moved to South Common c. 1808	
Chiddingly	Willard's Mill, The Dicker; Old Mill					
Chiddingly	Black Mill, The Dicker					
Chiddingly	Golden Cross Mill, The Dicker; Wicken's Mill; TQ 537 123	Post	1823	1823	Demolished 1919. roundhouse house converted Windmill World	
Chiddingly	Lower Dicker Mill; Ovenden's Mill; New Mill	Post		1813	Collapsed 28 December 1929	
Cross in Hand	Waldron Down Mill; TQ 652 216	Post		1598	Struck by lightning and severely damaged, 1790	
Cross in Hand	Old Mill; Little Mill; TQ 557 218	Post		1791	Demolished 1903; Windmill World	
Cross in Hand	New Mill; TQ 558 218	Post		1855	Windmill World	
Crowborough	Beacon Mill	Post		1782	Burnt down c. 1940	
Crowborough	Pratt's Mill; TQ 518 311	Tower		1862		
Crowhurst						

=== D - E ===
Location	Name of mill and grid reference	Type	Maps	First mention or built	Last mention or demise	Photograph
Dallington	TQ 660 193	Smock		c. 1852	Demolished 1913; Windmill World	
Ditchling	Elphick's Farm Mill	Hollow post		c. 1884	1904	
East Blatchington	Black Mill					
East Blatchington	Pumping mill	Tower		1882	Demolished c. 1919	
Eastbourne	Parsonage Mill; Black Mill; Watt's Lane Mill; Rectory Manor Mill	Post				
Eastbourne	Paradise Hill Mill					
Eastbourne	White Mill	Post				
Eastbourne	Rodmill Farm Mill					
Eastbourne	Radmill Village Mill	Post				
Eastbourne	Ocklynge Mill	Tower			Standing in 1934	
Eastbourne	Old Mill	Tower		1800	Replaced by Hurst's Mill, 1808	
Eastbourne	Hurst's Mill; St John's Mill	Tower		1808	Demolished 1950	
Eastbourne	Bullock Down	Wind wheel				
Eastbourne	Pashley Down	Vertical axle mill		1752	1767, Demolished by 1785	
Eastbourne	Pashley Down	Post	1724	1724	1785, later burnt down	
Eastbourne	Seafront	Vertical axle mill		1757	1780s	
Eastbourne	Ocklynge Hill	Vertical axle mill		c. 1767	Burnt down 1811	
Eastbourne	Black Mill	Post				
East Grinstead	North End Mill			1564	Burnt down 1757	
East Grinstead	Common Mill			1767	Standing 1900	
East Grinstead	Ashurst Wood Mill; Cutten's Hill Mill	Smock			Demolished 1882	
East Grinstead	Pook Hill Mill		1823	1823	1823, gone by 1841	
East Hoathly		Post			Burnt down 1824	
East Hoathly		Post		1824	Burnt down December 1891	
Ewhurst	Brasses' Mill		1724	1724	1724	
Ewhurst	Beacon Mill					
Ewhurst	Staplecross Mill	Smock		1815	Demolished 1951	

=== F ===
Location	Name of mill and grid reference	Type	Maps	First mention or built	Last mention or demise	Photograph
Fairlight	Old Mill	Smock	1813	1813	Burnt down 1872	
Fairlight	Batchelor's Mill	Post			Standing in 1859	
Falmer	Old Mill	Smock	1724	1617	1724, later burnt down	
Falmer	Falmer Mill	Post		1801	Moved within Falmer, 1817	
Falmer	Mill Street	Post		1817	1866	
Falmer	Race Hill Mill	Post		1861	Blown down 16 May 1913	
Firle	Firle Mill		1724	1724	1724	
Forest Row	Old Mill					
Framfield	Mount Ephraim Mill	Post		1841	Moved to Cross in Hand, 1855	
Framfield	Blackboys Mill	Post		1868	Demolished 1944	
Frant	Benhall Mill	Post		1818	1880s, gone by 1900	
Frant						
Friston	Friston Mill	Post			Blown down January 1926.	

=== G ===
Location	Name of mill and grid reference	Type	Maps	First mention or built	Last mention or demise	Photograph
Glynde		Post		1807	Moved to Blackboys 1868	
Glynde		Hollow Post		Mid-19th century	Moved to High Salvington 2007	
Glynde	Glyndebourne Mill; Ringmer Mill	Post	1724	1700	Collapsed 1925	
Guestling	Old Mill; Pickham Farm Mill	post	1813			
Guestling	Guestling mill Jenner's Mill; Down Mill; Fairlight Mill	Smock		1859	Demolished c. 1918	

=== H ===
Location	Name of mill and grid reference	Type	Maps	First mention or built	Last mention or demise	Photograph
Hailsham	Upper Mill	Post				
Hailsham	South Common Mill	Post		1691	Standing in 1711, gone by 1735.	
Hailsham	Lower Mill; Hamlin's Mill	Smock		1834	Burnt down November 1923	
Hailsham	Harebeating Mill; Upper Mill; TQ 595 105	Post	1823	1823	Collapsed 1934. Modern house built on roundhouse. Windmill World	
Hamsey		Post	1724	1724	1724	
Hamsey	Offham Mill; Racehill Mill; Steeres Mill	Smock				
Hankham			1724	1724	1813	
Hastings	Summerfield's Mill					
Hastings	French's Mill; Croft Road Mill	Smock		1799	Moved to Silverhill, St Leonards c. 1838	
Hastings	Priory Road Mill #1					
Hastings	Priory Road Mill #2					
Hastings	Priory Road Mill #3					
Hastings	Priory Road Mill #4					
Hastings	Priory Road Mill #5					
Hastings	Town Mill					
Hastings	Six sailed mill	Post				
Heathfield	Sandy Cross Mill	Post		1842	Demolished 1916	
Heathfield	Broad Oak Mill	Post		1842	Burnt down 11 March 1890	
Heathfield	Mutton Hall Mill	Post		1805	Demolished 1891	
Heathfield	Cade Street Mill; Chapman's Town Mill	Smock			Gone by 1936	
Heathfield	Punnetts Town Mill	Post			Burnt down 1856	
Heathfield	Punnetts Town Mill; Blackdown Mill; Cherry Clack Mill; TQ 627 209	Smock		1856	Windmill World	
Heathfield	Punnetts Town Saw Mill	Smock		1862	Demolished 1934	
Heathfield	Alexandra Road	Wind wheel			c. 1910	
Heathfield	Punnetts Town	Wind wheel		c. 1908	Dismantled 1916	
Hellingly	Old Mill; North Street Mill	Post		1781	Blown down 1908	
Herstmonceux	Windmill Hill Mill	Post				
Herstmonceux	Windmill Hill Mill; TQ 648 122	Post		c. 1814	Windmill World	
Herstmonceux	Bodle Street Green Mill	Post		1780s		
Herstmonceux	Cowbeech Mill; Erry's Mill; TQ 621 147	Smock	1823	1820	Demolished c. 1919; Windmill World	
Hooe	Hooe Common Mill	Post	1813		Demolished by 1934	
Hooe	Hooe Common Mill	Smock				
Horham		Smock			Moved to Punnetts Town 1866	

=== I - L ===
Location	Name of mill and grid reference	Type	Maps	First mention or built	Last mention or demise	Photograph
Icklesham	Telegraph Hill Mill	Smock		1834	Demolished c. 1922	
Icklesham	Village Mill	Post				
Icklesham	Hogg Hill Mill; TQ 888 160	Post		1790	Windmill World	
Iden		Post				
Iford		Sunk Post		1155	1155	
Kingston	Kingston Mill; Ashcombe mill TQ 392 089	Post		1832	Blown down, March 1916	
Kingston	Kingston Mill; Ashcombe mill TQ 392 089	Post		2009	Facsimile of original mill, for residential and electricity generation purposes.	
Kingston	Old Duck Mill; TQ 402 092	Smock		1802	Collapsed 1891; Windmill World	
Laughton	Laughton Mill		1724	1724	1724	
Lewes	Town Mill	Smock		1802	Moved to new site, c. 1818 (Shelley's Mill). Windmill World	
Lewes	Shelly's Mill	Smock		c. 1818	Demolished 1922	
Lewes	Southern Mill	Post		c. 1785	Demolished c. 1912	
Lewes	Spital Mill	Post		1770	Burnt down May 1885	
Lewes	Malling Mill	Post		1625	Burnt down 8 September 1908	
Lewes	King Harry's Mill	Post		1264	1264	
Lewes	Smart's Mill					
Lewes	Southover Mill				Blown down 1888	
Little Horsted	Old Mill					

=== M - N ===
Location	Name of mill and grid reference	Type	Maps	First mention or built	Last mention or demise	Photograph
Mark Cross	Walter's Mill; TQ 585 315	Tower		1845	Windmill World	
Mayfield	Luggers Crouch Mill			1795	1825	
Mayfield	Gravil Hill Mill			1711	1720	
Mayfield	Argos Hill Mill; TQ 571 283	Post		1835	Windmill World	
Newenden	pumping mill	Trestle				
Newhaven	Bolen's Mill				Burnt down 1844	
Newhaven		Smock		1844	Moved to North Chailey	
Newhaven		Post				
Newick	Old Mill					
Ninfield	Ashburnham Mill	Post		1809	Standing 1936, demolished by September 1937	
Ninfield	Lunsford's Cross Mill; Thorne Mill	Smock		c. 1870	Demolished 1907	
Northiam	Old mill	Post	1795	1795	Burnt down 1800	
Northiam	High Park Mill; Millcorner Mill	Post		1800	Demolished 1949	
Nutley	Nutley Mill; TQ 451 291	Post		c. 1817	Windmill World	

=== O - P ===
Location	Name of mill and grid reference	Type	Maps	First mention or built	Last mention or demise	Photograph
Ore	White Mill; Cheale's Mill	Smock	1813; 1823	1813	Burnt down May 1900	
Ore	Black Mill; Down Mill	Smock		1855	Demolished c. 1918	
Patcham		Post	1724	1620	1791	
Patcham	Ballard's Mill	Smock		c. 1780	Demolished c. 1900	
Patcham	Waterhall Mill; TQ 292 086	Tower		1885	Windmill World	
Peasemarsh		Smock			Standing 1936	
Pett	Pett Mill	Post		1781	Moved to Icklesham, 1790	
Piddinghoe	Peddinghoe Mill		1724	1724	1724	
Playden	Black Mill				Standing c. 1915	
Playden	Old Mill	Post			Moved to Appledore, Kent by 1819	
Playden	Playden Mill					
Playden	TQ 9233 2123	Smock				
Playden	TQ 9217 2141	Post			Standing 1936	
Polegate	Ovenden's Mill; Mockett's Mill; TQ 582 041	Tower		1817	Windmill World	
Portslade	East Hill Mill	Post		1837	1837	
Portslade	Copperas Gap Mill	Post		1820	Demolished 1882	
Pevensey	Blackness Mill			1778	1779	

=== R - S ===
Location	Name of mill and grid reference	Type	Maps	First mention or built	Last mention or demise	Photograph
Ringmer	Broyle Mill	Post			Burnt down 1905	
Ripe	Old Mill		1724; 1813	1724	1813	
Rodmell				1199	1199	
Rodmell	Old Mill	Post	1813	c. 1801	Demolished 12 January 1912	
Rottingdean	Dudeney's Hill Mill	Post	1783; 1813	1773	1818, possibly moved to Whitehawk Hill, Brighton	
Rottingdean	Beacon Mill; New Mill; TQ 366 025	Smock		1802	Windmill World	
Rottingdean		Smock				
Rye	Wilkinson's Mill					
Rye		Smock			Moved to Punnetts Town 1862	
Rye		Post	1596	1596	Gone by 1758	
Rye	Old Mill	Post		1758	Replaced by smock mill 1824	
Rye	New mill Gibbet Mill; Tillingham Mill; Barry's Mill; TQ 917 203	Smock		1824	Burnt down 13 June 1930; Windmill World	
Salehurst	Silverhill Mill					
Seaford	Sutton Mill	Post				
Sidley	Sidley Mill			1723	Burnt down 1797	
Sidley	Sidley Mill; Pankhurst's Mill	Smock		1798	Moved to Leigh, Kent, 1928	
St Leonards	Tivoli Old Mill	Post	1813			
St Leonards	Tivoli New Mill					
St Leonards	Silverhill Mill	Smock		c. 1838	Burnt down 1867	
St Leonards	Draper's Mill; Silverhill Mill	Smock		1868	Demolished 1966	
Stone Cross	Stone Cross Mill; Blackness Mill; White Mill; TQ 620 043	Tower		1876	Windmill World	
Stone Cross	Black Mill	Post				

=== U - W ===
Location	Name of mill and grid reference	Type	Maps	First mention or built	Last mention or demise	Photograph
Uckfield	Old Mill					
Udimore	Udimore Mill	Post			Demolished 1922	
Wadhurst	Cousley Wood Mill				Standing 1885	
Wadhurst	Riseden Mill; TQ 622 303	Post	1823	1821	Collapsed 1910; Windmill World	
Wadhurst	Butcher's Wood Mill; White's Mill			1866	1894	
Wadhurst	Bestbeech Hill Mill; Standen's Mill		1795	1795	Standing 1801, possibly moved to Riseden by 1821	
Warbleton	Summer Hill Mill	Post		c. 1825	Demolished August 1936	
Warbleton	Chapman's Mill	Smock		1838	Struck by lightning 16 July 1880	
Wartling	Wartling Mill					
Wartling	Boreham Street Mill	Post	1813			
West Blatchington	West Blatchington Mill; TQ 279 068	Smock	1823	1823	Windmill World	
Westfield	Church Mill	1724	1724	1724		
Westfield	White Mill					
Westfield	North Mill				One of the Westfield mills burnt down 5 November 1908	
Westham	Westham Mill					
Westham		Hollow Post		1860	Moved to Weald and Downland Open Air Museum, 1975	
Whatlington	Whatlington Mill; Old Mill			1849	1849	
Willingdon	Old Mill		1813			
Winchelsea				1297	1297	
Winchelsea	Iham Mill	Post	1813	1760	1813, moved to new site by 1823	
Winchelsea	St Leonard's Mill; TQ 902 176	Post		c. 1823	Blown down 16 October 1987	

== Locations formerly within East Sussex ==
For windmills in Lamberhurst see List of windmills in Kent.

== Sources ==
Unless stated otherwise, the source for all entries is Brunnarius, Martin (1979). The Windmills of Sussex. Chichester: Philimore. ISBN 0-85033-345-8. or Hemming, Peter (1936). Windmills in Sussex. London: C W Daniel. Online version

== Maps ==
- 1596 Robert Morden
- 1724 Richard Budgen
- 1795 Gardner & Gream
- 1813 Ordnance Survey
- 1823 C & G Greenwood
