= List of museums in East Sussex =

Museums in East Sussex, England

This list of museums in East Sussex, England contains museums which are defined for this context as institutions (including nonprofit organizations, government entities, and private businesses) that collect and care for objects of cultural, artistic, scientific, or historical interest and make their collections or related exhibits available for public viewing. Also included are non-profit art galleries and university art galleries. Museums that exist only in cyberspace (i.e., virtual museums) are not included.

== Museums ==
Name	Image	Town/City	Region	Type	Summary
1066 Battle Of Hastings, Abbey & Battlefield		Battle	Rother	History	Operated by the English Heritage, includes the abbey ruins, visitor centre, battlefield site
Alfriston Clergy House		Alfriston	Wealden	Historic house	Operated by the National Trust, 14th century Wealden hall house with a thatched roof
Anne of Cleves House		Lewes	Lewes	Historic house	15th century hall house with local history displays, furniture and decorative items from different periods
Bateman's		Burwash	Rother	Historic house	Operated by the National Trust, 17th-century house owned by author Rudyard Kipling, includes working watermill
Battle Museum of Local History		Battle	Rother	Local	local history, prehistoric, Roman, medieval, 17th/18th centuries, and local industries such as iron, leather and gunpowder
Bentley Wildfowl and Motor Museum		Halland	Wealden	Multiple	Palladian mansion with furnishings, automobile museum, gardens, wildfowl reserve, miniature steam train, woodlands
Bexhill Museum		Bexhill-on-Sea	Rother	Multiple	Local history, natural history, fashion, dinosaurs, stone-age life, Ancient Egyptians, military, world cultures, British motor racing
Bluebell Railway		Fletching	Lewes	Transport	Heritage railway with museum displays at the Sheffield Park railway station
Bodiam Castle		Robertsbridge	Rother	Historic house	Operated by the National Trust, 14th century moated castle in ruins, periodic living history demonstrations
Booth Museum of Natural History		Brighton	Brighton and Hove	Natural history	Victorian-style dioramas of British birds in their habitat settings, butterflies, British fossils, animal bones
Brede Waterworks		Brede	Rother	Technology	Former waterworks with working steam engines
Brighton Fishing Museum		Brighton	Brighton and Hove	Maritime	Local fishing industry, boats
Brighton Museum & Art Gallery		Brighton	Brighton and Hove	Multiple	Art, decorative arts, natural history, puppets, fashion, world culture artifacts, Egyptian artifacts, local history
Brighton Toy and Model Museum		Brighton	Brighton and Hove	Toy	Formerly the Sussex Toy And Model Museum, toys, dolls, model trains, puppets, penny arcade games
British Engineerium		Hove	Brighton and Hove	Technology	Victorian pumping station with beam engines, planned museum
Charleston Farmhouse		Firle	Lewes	Historic house	Country home of the Bloomsbury group, interior decorations by Duncan Grant and Vanessa Bell, exhibit gallery for fine and decorative art
De La Warr Pavilion		Bexhill-on-Sea	Rother	Art	Contemporary arts centre
Ditchling Museum of Art + Craft		Ditchling	Lewes	Art	local art, crafts and applied art
Eastbourne Heritage Centre		Eastbourne	Eastbourne	Local	operated by the Eastbourne Society
Eastbourne RNLI Museum		Eastbourne	Eastbourne	Maritime	history of area lifeboat rescuing, operated by the Royal National Lifeboat Institution
Fabrica		Brighton	Brighton and Hove	Art	located in a former church, contemporary visual arts exhibitions
Farley Farm House		Chiddingly	Wealden	Art	Home of photographer Lee Miller and biographer of Picasso, Roland Penrose, exhibits of Surrealist and Modern art
Firle Place		Firle	Lewes	Historic house	18th-century country estate with fine art and furnishings, gardens
Flower Makers' Museum		Hastings	Hastings	Textile	information, original company tools of the trade, machines and fabrics for making artificial flowers
Glynde Place		Glynde	Lewes	Historic house	Elizabethan manor house, gardens
Grange Museum & Art Gallery		Rottingdean	Brighton and Hove	Multiple	local history, art
Great Dixter		Northiam	Rother	Historic house	Medieval timber-framed manor house, Arts and Crafts style gardens
Hastings Fishermen's Museum		Hastings	Hastings	Maritime	Local fishing industry, boats, The Stade
Hastings History House		Hastings	Hastings	Local	local history, operated by the Old Hastings Preservation Society
Hastings Lifeboat Station		Hastings	Hastings	Maritime	visitor centre with film, viewing of the lifeboats
Hastings Museum and Art Gallery		Hastings	Hastings	Multiple	Art, local history, art and artifacts of the Indian subcontinent, decorative arts, natural history, Native American artifacts
Heritage Mill, North Chailey		Chailey	Lewes	Mill	Early 19th century windmill
Herstmonceux Museum		Herstmonceux	Wealden	History	old electricity generating station, operated by the Lime Park Heritage Trust
Hove Museum and Art Gallery		Hove	Brighton and Hove	Multiple	Art, contemporary crafts, local history, toys, early cinema artifacts
How We Lived Then		Eastbourne	Eastbourne	History	authentic Victorian period shops, room settings, displays covering 100 years of shopping and social history
Jerwood Gallery		Hastings	Hastings	Art	Contemporary art gallery, collection of 20th and 21st century British art
Kent and East Sussex Railway		Northiam	Rother	Railway	Heritage railway, accessed at the Northiam railway station
Lamb House		Rye	Rother	Historic house	Operated by the National Trust, 18th-century house with literary connections including Henry James, E. F. Benson and Rumer Godden
Lavender Line		Isfield	Wealden	Railway	Heritage railway and exhibits including model railway at the Isfield railway station
Lewes Castle		Lewes	Lewes	History	11th century motte and bailey castle, includes Barbican House Museum with archaeology and medieval life displays, and the Town Model of Lewes
Mechanical Memories Museum		Brighton	Brighton and Hove	Amusement	working vintage penny slot machines
Michelham Priory		Upper Dicker	Wealden	Open air	Medieval priory house with furnishings from different periods, historic watermill, rope making museum, replica Iron Age roundhouse and other buildings, art exhibits, gardens
Monk's House		Rodmell	Lewes	Historic house	Operated by the National Trust, 18th century cottage home of author Virginia Woolf and husband Leonard Woolf, connections to the Bloomsbury group
Newhaven Fort		Newhaven	Lewes	Military	Napoleonic-era fort and Martello tower with area military artefacts and memorabilia, exhibits on local military, World War I and World War II
Newhaven Museum		Newhaven	Lewes	Multiple	local history, maritime artifacts, operated by the Newhaven Historical Society
Nutley Windmill		Nutley	Wealden	Mill	Early 19th century windmill
Observatory Science Center		Herstmonceux	Wealden	Science	located at Herstmonceux Castle estate
Old Police Cells Museum		Brighton	Brighton and Hove	Law enforcement	History of the Sussex Police, housed in the basement of Brighton Town Hall
Ovenden's Mill		Polegate	Wealden	Mill	Early 19th century windmill
Paradise Park, Newhaven		Newhaven	Lewes	Natural history	includes Planet Earth Museum with dinosaurs, fossils, geology, gardens, planthouses
Pevensey Court House Museum		Pevensey	Wealden	Local	located in the former courthouse, includes prison cells, exercise yard and stocks, displays of local history
Preston Manor, Brighton		Brighton	Brighton and Hove	Historic house	Early 20th century period Edwardian manor
Redoubt Fortress & Military Museum		Eastbourne	Eastbourne	Military	Napoleonic-era fort with area military artefacts and memorabilia, includes collections of The Royal Sussex Regiment, Queen's Royal Irish Hussars, vehicles, weapons, uniforms, medals
Regency Town House		Hove	Brighton and Hove	Local	1820s townhouse with focus on the architecture and social history of Brighton & Hove between the 1780s and 1840s
Royal Pavilion		Brighton	Brighton and Hove	Historic house	Early 19th century former royal seaside retreat, built in Indo-Saracenic style with lavish decorations and chinoiserie furnishings
Rye Art Gallery		Rye	Rother	Art	information
Rye Castle Museum		Rye	Rother	Multiple	Includes the Ypres Tower of the medieval castle, and the East Street Site with local history exhibits
Rye Heritage Centre		Rye	Rother	Local	local history using sound and light show, working collection of old pier amusement machines
Seaford Museum		Seaford	Lewes	Local	Located in a Martello tower, local history, military, period stores and rooms, household items, model railway, maritime heritage
Shipwreck Museum		Hastings	Hastings	Maritime	artifacts from local shipwrecks, rocks and fossils, changes in the coast, coastal defense
Stanmer Rural Museum		Stanmer	Brighton and Hove	Agriculture	rural life artifacts, farm tools and equipment, wagons, reconstructed blacksmith's forge, household items, operated by the Stanmer Preservation Society
Stone Cross Windmill		Stone Cross	Wealden	Mill	Late 19th century windmill
Towner		Eastbourne	Eastbourne	Art	Contemporary art museum and gallery
Volk's Electric Railway		Brighton	Brighton and Hove	Railway	Heritage railway that runs along a length of the seafront of Brighton
West Blatchington Windmill		West Blatchington	Brighton and Hove	Mill	Early 19th century windmill
Winchelsea Court Hall Museum		Winchelsea	Rother	Local	Local history, maps, models, pictures, seals, local pottery and items of daily life
Windmill Hill Mill		Herstmonceux	Wealden	Mill	Early 19th century windmill

== Defunct museums ==
- Musgrave Museum, Eastbourne, life of St. Paul
- Yesterday's World, Battle, closed in 2015

Bentley Wildflower and Motor Museum is no longer operating, despite there being a ‘brown sign’ on the main road

== See also ==
- Visitor attractions in East Sussex
