= King's Head Mill =

Windmill in Battle, East Sussex, England

King's Mead Mill
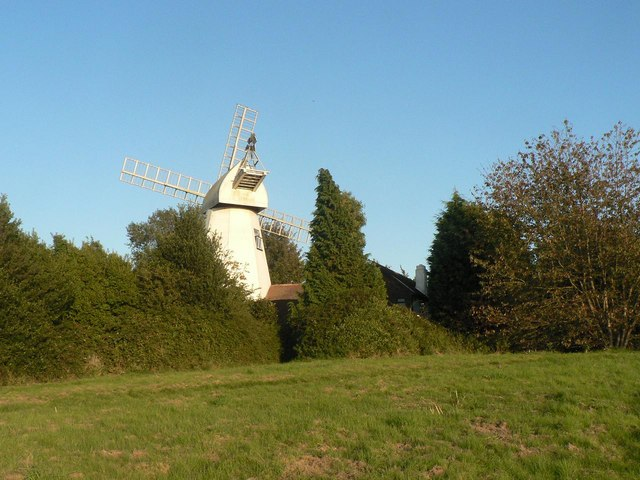
- The mill in 2007

Origin
- Mill name: Kings Mead Mill; Caldbec Hill Mill
- Grid reference: TQ 748 166
- Coordinates: 50.922°N 0.486°E
- Operator(s): Private
- Year built: 1805

Information
- Purpose: Corn mill
- Type: Smock mill
- Storeys: Four-storey smock
- Base storeys: Single-storey base
- Smock sides: Eight sides
- No. of sails: Four sails
- Windshaft: Cast iron
- Winding: Fantail
- Fantail blades: Six blades
- No. of pairs of millstones: Three pairs

King's Mead Mill (also Battle Windmill or Caldbec Hill Mill) is a grade II listed smock mill at Battle, Sussex, England, which has been converted to residential accommodation.

== History ==
King's Mead Mill was built in 1805, replacing a post mill. The mill was working until the First World War and in 1924 was stripped of its machinery and house converted. The work was done by Neve's, the Heathfield millwrights.

== Description ==
King's Mead Mill is a four-storey smock mill on a single-storey brick base. It has a Kentish-style cap winded by a fantail. When working it had four shuttered sails carried on a cast-iron windshaft, driving three pairs of millstones. The current windshaft is a dummy, added when the mill was converted. The original windshaft is displayed at Polegate windmill.

== Millers ==
- William Neve 1805 - 1839
- Porter 1839 - 1860
- Henry Harmer
- 1911-1914 freeman
- Jenner - WWI
