= Cawston Road Mill, Aylsham =

Tower mill in Norfolk, England

Aylsham Windmill
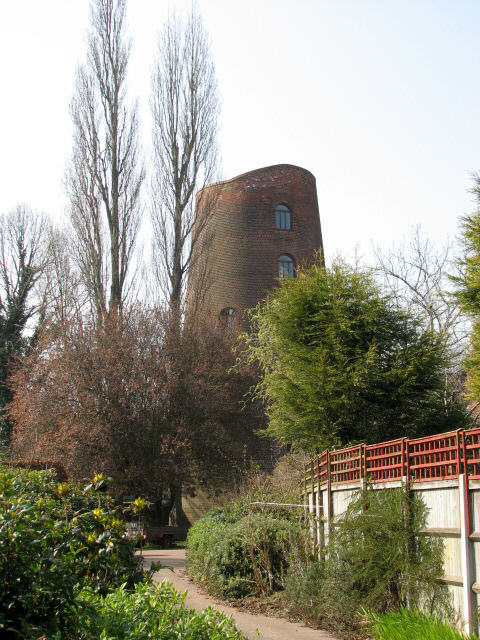
- The mill in 2007
- Interactive map of Aylsham Windmill

Origin
- Mill name: Aylsham Mill
- Mill location: TG185265
- Coordinates: 52.791803°N 1.2391915°E
- Operator: Private
- Year built: 1826

Information
- Purpose: Corn mill
- Type: Tower mill
- Storeys: Seven storeys
- No. of sails: Four sails
- Type of sails: Double Patent sails
- Winding: Fantail
- Fantail blades: Eight blades
- Auxiliary power: Steam engine
- No. of pairs of millstones: Three pairs, a fourth pair worked by engine
- Year lost: 1920
- Other information: Demolition abandoned in 1920

Cawston Road Mill is a tower mill at Aylsham, Norfolk, England, which has been truncated and converted for use as a holiday home.

== History ==
Cawston Road Mill was built in 1826 for Henry Soame. He died in 1833 and the mill passed to his son George. He ran the mill for a number of years before leasing it out. Miller John Neech became bankrupt in 1860 and George Soame took over the mill again. The mill was offered for sale by auction on 18 June 1864 at the Dog Inn, Aylsham. A 6 horsepower (4.5 kW) steam engine had been installed to supply auxiliary power by this time. In 1865, Soame defaulted on a mortgage on the mill and it was offered for sale by auction at the Dog Inn on 9 May 1865.

The mill was purchased for £370 by Henry Edward Soame, the brother of George. He leased the mill to James Faulke. Soame died on 31 July 1872 and the mill was sold by auction at the Black Boys Inn, Aylsham on 24 September 1872. The mill was purchased for £315 by James Davidson, who also operated the Buttlands Mill in Aylsham. Davidson ran the mill until 1896 when he ran into financial difficulties and the mill was sold by auction on 17 March 1896 at the Black Boys Inn. Charles Stapleton bought the mill for £100, and then resold it to James Davidson Jr for £125. In 1900, Davidson defaulted on the mortgage and the mill was sold to Samuel Lomax, a butcher in Aylsham, for £200. The mill was not able to be powered by wind at this time as it had been struck by lightning and it was struck again in 1912.

During the First World War, the mill was used by a unit of the Royal Army Veterinary Corps. The cap and sails were blown off in about 1920 and it was decided to demolish the mill, but it was so solidly built that work was halted when just over one storey had been removed. The empty mill tower stood for many years with jagged brickwork. In 1998, the mill tower was converted to serve as holiday accommodation. The conversion of the mill was rewarded by an Enhancement Award for Conservation by Broadland District Council.

== Description ==
Cawston Road Mill was a seven-storey tower mill which had a boat shaped cap winded by an eight bladed fantail. It had four double Patent sails each having nine bays of three shutters and drove three pairs of millstones, with a fourth pair driven by engine. A stage was provided at second floor level.

== Millers ==
- Henry Soame 1826–33
- George Soame 1833–45
- William Drake Gardiner
- Harris and John Neech –1760
- George Soame 1860–65
- James Faulke 1868–78
- James Davidson 1872–1896
- James Davison Jr 1896–1900

Reference for above:-
