= Kathleen Marion Barrow =

British writer

Kathleen Marion Barrow (20 August 1870 in Ryde, Isle of Wight – 4 October 1952 in Rotherfield, Sussex) was a British novelist and journalist. Her parents were Major-General Joseph Lyon Barrow and Emily (née McMaster).

During World War I, Barrow was a Voluntary Aid Detachment (V.A.D.) nurse, writing the account of her experience in 'A V.A.D. at the Base' published in 'Reminiscent Sketches 1914 to 1919'. In 1914, she also published 'How women can help the wounded' with Anna B de Cunynghame and Fleming Mant Sandwith as part of the Standard 'How to Help Series'. In the early 1920s, Barrow worked for The Times newspaper, writing weekly articles on London fashions.

Barrow published the novels Brushwood (1922); The Singing Heart (1923); Sarah Herring (1924) and Rosewood and Mahogany (1929).
