= New Mill, Cross-in-Hand =

Windmill in East Sussex, England

New Mill, Cross in Hand
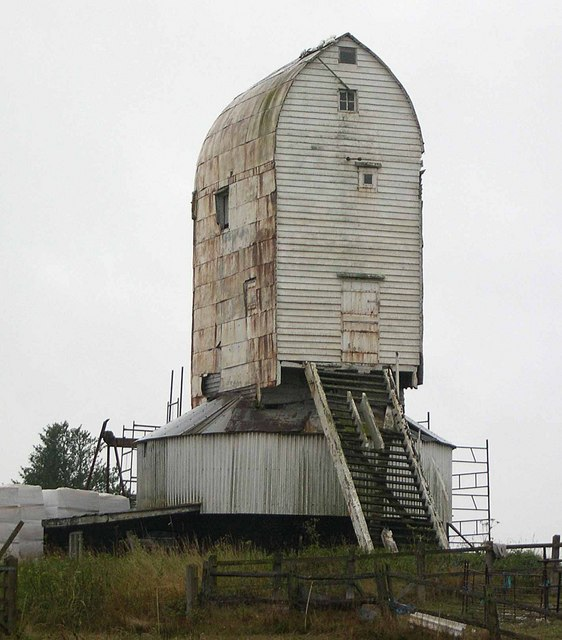
- The mill in 2006

Origin
- Grid reference: TQ 558 218
- Coordinates: 50°58′30″N 0°13′05″E
- Year built: 1868

Information
- Purpose: Corn mill
- Type: Post mill
- Roundhouse storeys: Two storey roundhouse
- No. of sails: Four
- Type of sails: Patent sails
- Windshaft: Cast iron
- Winding: Tailpole mounted fantail
- Fantail blades: Eight blades
- No. of pairs of millstones: Three pairs
- Other information: Originally built at Framfield, moved in 1855 and 1868.

New Mill is a Grade II* listed post mill at Cross in Hand near Heathfield, East Sussex, England. It was the last windmill working commercially by wind in Sussex, ceasing work by wind in 1969 when a stock broke.

== History ==
New Mill was built at Mount Ephraim, Framfield in the early 19th century. In 1855, it was moved to a site some ¼ mile (400 m) south west of its current position. The move was done by Samuel Medhurst, the Lewes millwright. In 1868, it was moved again to its current position, joining another windmill which became known as the Old Mill. Medhurst was also responsible for this move. The mill was working until 1969, when a stock broke. Milling continued by auxiliary power in an adjoining building until 1971. The mill is currently under restoration. In August 2014, concerns were raised about the condition of the mill, which is owned by brothers Brian and Geoff Newnham. Following inspection by a millwright in 2015, a crowdfunding appeal was launched to raise £3,000 for emergency repairs to the trestle. When the appeal closed on 8 June, £1,654 had been raised. The Mills Archive Trust also opened an appeal, allowing people to donate by cheque, with the added benefit of being able to increase their donations by 25% via Gift Aid. A total in excess of £7,000 was raised by the two appeals. Initial work to strengthen the trestle was scheduled to be completed in October 2015.

== Description ==
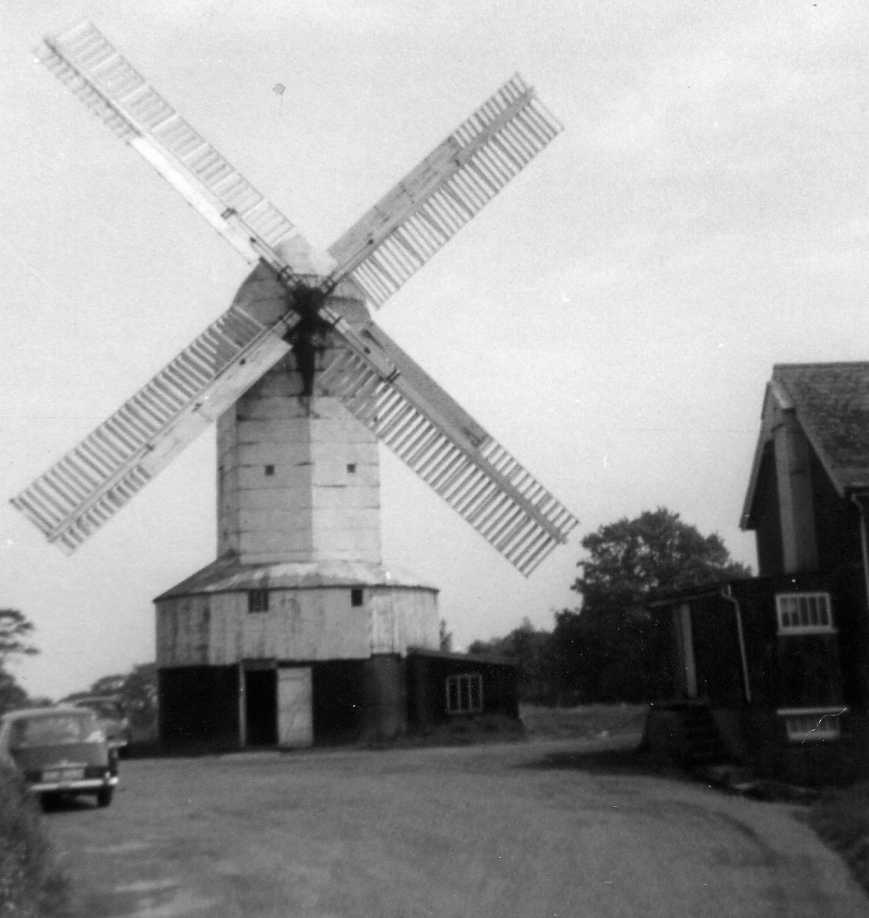
New Mill, 1967

New Mill is a post mill on a two-storey roundhouse. It had four patent sails carried on a cast iron windshaft and was winded by a tailpole-mounted fantail. When originally built, the fantail was roof-mounted, in a similar manner to that still to be seen at Hogg Hill, Icklesham. Medhurst fitted a five-bladed fantail, which was replaced in 1907 by an eight-bladed fantail of 11 feet (3.35 m) diameter by Neve of Heathfield. The mill originally drove two pairs of millstones, driven by a 9-foot-8-inch (2.95 m) diameter head wheel and 8-foot-4-inch (2.54 m) diameter tail wheel. Later, another pair was added to the breast, driven by a spur gear arrangement, the spur wheel being 4 feet (1.22 m) diameter. One pair of stones in the breast was removed in 1933.

The body of New Mill is 21 feet (6.40 m) long and 12 feet (3.66 m) wide. The mill is 45 feet (13.72 m) high to the roof. The roundhouse is 25 feet (7.62 m) diameter and the main post is 2 feet 6 inches (760 mm) square.

== Millers ==
- William Kenward 1855 -
- Mrs Kenward - 1882
- Jabez Ashdown 1882 - 1926
- John Newnham 1882 -
- John Ashdown 1926 - 1937
- J B Newnham and Son 1937 - 1971
- Sidney Ashdown 1937 - 1971

References for above:-
