= Pratt's Mill, Crowborough =

Windmill in Crowborough, East Sussex, England

Crowborough Windmill
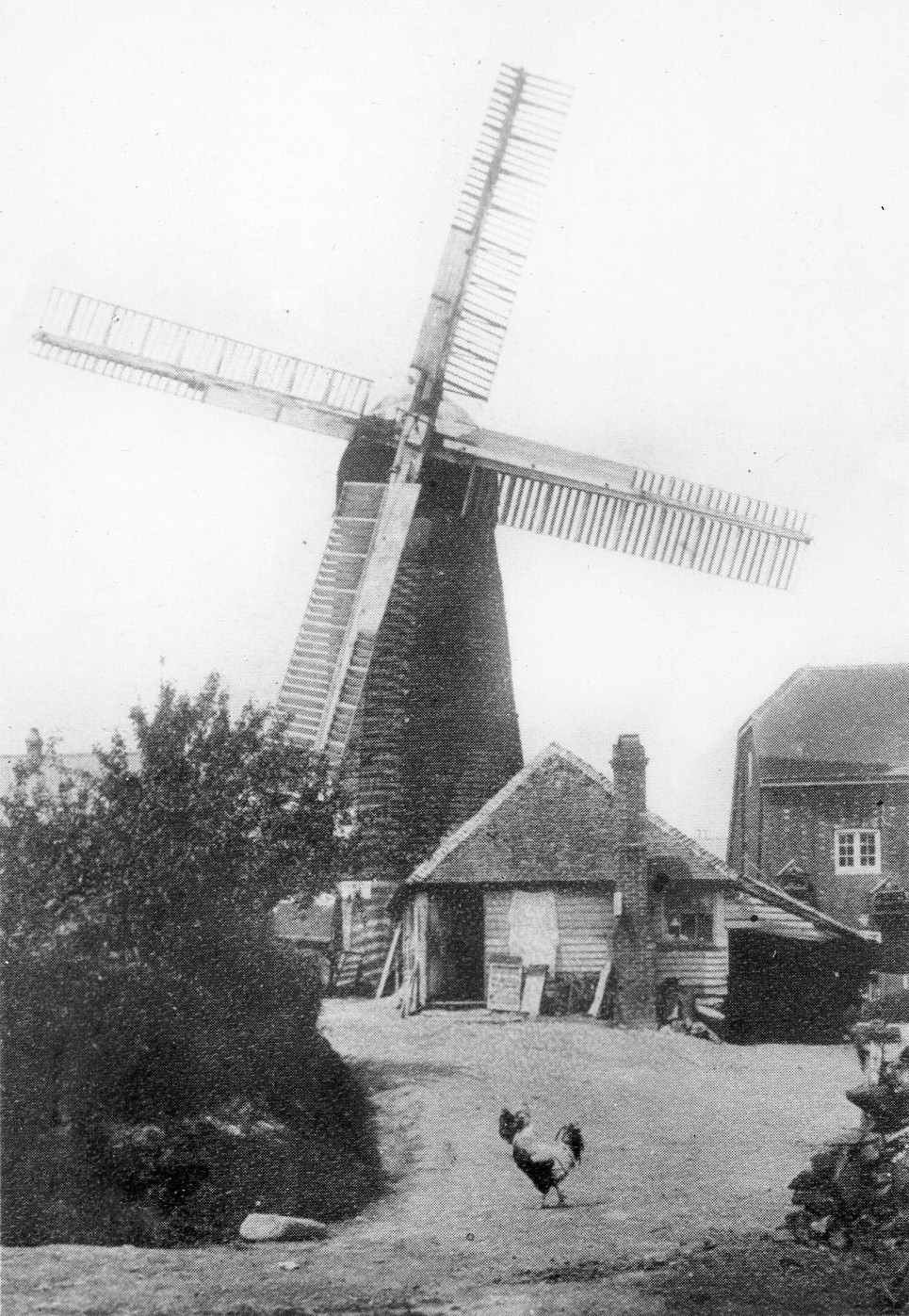
- The mill c1905

Origin
- Mill name: Pratt's Mill
- Grid reference: TQ 518 311
- Coordinates: 51.059°N 0.165°E
- Operator(s): Private
- Year built: 1862

Information
- Purpose: Corn mill
- Type: Tower
- Storeys: Five storeys
- No. of sails: Four sails
- Type of sails: Patent sails
- Winding: Fantail
- No. of pairs of millstones: Three pairs
- Year lost: Truncated 1927

Pratt's Mill is a tower mill at Crowborough, Sussex, England which has been truncated and converted to residential accommodation.

== History ==
Pratt's Mill was built between September 1861 and February 1862. The machinery from Calverley Mill, Tunbridge Wells was used in the construction of the mill. On 3 February 1862 the son of the miller was killed when he became entangled in the machinery. The mill was working by wind until 1907 and then by steam until 1922. Frank Brangwyn, RA painted the mill when it was without sails and fantail. The picture appears in an early book on windmills. In 1927 the mill was converted into residential accommodation, being reduced in height to three storeys.

== Description ==
As built, Pratt's Mill was a five-storey brick tower mill clad in peg tiles. It had four Patent sails and the Kentish-style cap was winded by a fantail. All that remains today is the lower three storeys of the tower, with various additions and extensions. Hemming states that the mill may have driven three pairs of millstones.

== Millers ==
- Richard Pratt 1861
- Samuel Pratt 1881 - 1891

References for above:-
