= Argos Hill Mill, Mayfield =

Windmill in Mayfield, East Sussex, England

Argos Hill Windmill, Mayfield
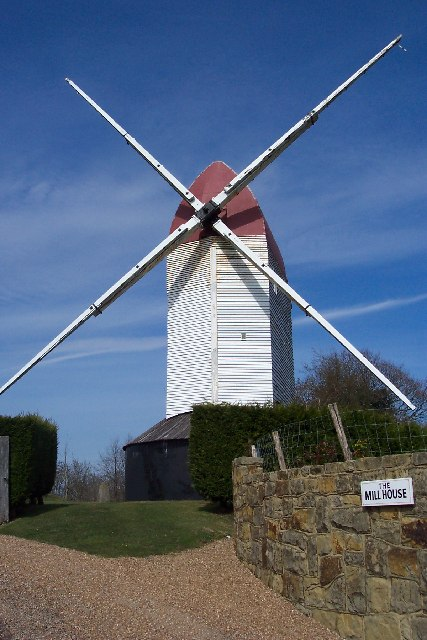
- The mill in 2003
- Interactive map of Argos Hill Windmill, Mayfield

Origin
- Grid reference: TQ 571 283
- Coordinates: 51°01′59″N 0°14′20″E
- Operator: Argos Hill Windmill Trust
- Year built: 1835

Information
- Purpose: Corn mill
- Type: Post mill
- Roundhouse storeys: Single storey roundhouse
- No. of sails: Four
- Type of sails: Patent sails
- Windshaft: Cast iron
- Winding: Tailpole mounted fantail
- Fantail blades: Eight
- No. of pairs of millstones: Two pairs, arranged head and tail
- Other information: Main post constructed of four pieces of timber.

Argos Hill Mill is a grade II* listed post mill at Argos Hill, Mayfield, East Sussex, England

== Description ==
Argos Hill Mill is a post mill on a single storey roundhouse. She had four patent sails carried on a cast iron windshaft and is winded by a tailpole mounted fantail. The main post is made up from four pieces of timber. Along with Jill, Clayton, she is one of only two windmills in England to retain this feature. The mill drove two pairs of millstones, arranged head and tail. The cast iron brake wheel is 10 feet (3.05 m) diameter and the wooden tail wheel is 8 feet (2.44 m) diameter. The mill is unusual in the way that it has been extended at the rear, giving it a distinctive appearance.

== History ==
The earliest record of a windmill on this site is in 1656. Argos Hill Mill was built in 1835. It worked by wind until 1927, mostly by successive generations of the Weston family. The fantail blew off in 1929 and the shutters were removed from the sails in 1932. The mill was acquired by Uckfield District Council in 1955. Neve's, the Heathfield millwrights fitted a new breast beam and repaired the side girts and corner posts. Further restoration work was done in 1969 by Hole's of Burgess Hill. A storm damaged a sail in 1976, and a new sail and stock were fitted by Hole's.

== Millers ==
- Aaron Weston - 1844
- William Richardson - 1927

== Threat of demolition ==
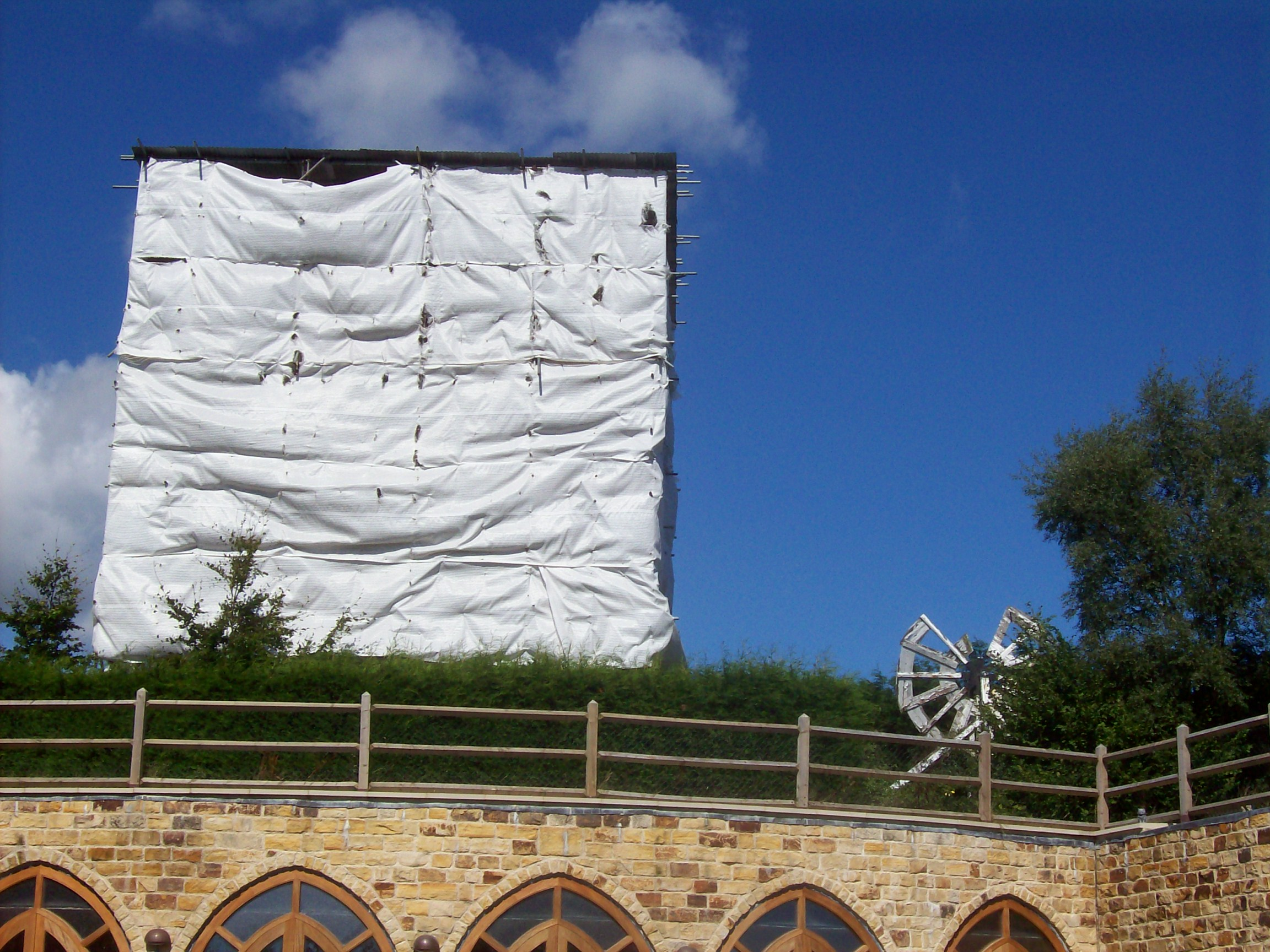
The mill in August 2008

A survey in 2007 revealed the mill was in danger of collapsing. Of concern were the roundhouse, crosstrees, crown tree, sails, tailpole and fantail. On 14 January 2008, a meeting was held in Mayfield, where Wealden District Council put forward options for the mill's future. One proposal, to dismantle the mill and remove it to storage was strongly criticised by those attending, including members of the Sussex Mills Group and the Society for the Protection of Ancient Buildings. It was pointed out that Wealden District Council had not spent money allocated for maintenance of the mill, and that giving themselves permission to demolish a listed building would make other listed buildings in the area more vulnerable, and erode the protection given by listed building status. As a result, the Friends of Argos Hill Windmill was set up to save the mill.

== Restoration ==
In April 2010, the Argos Hill Windmill Trust was established to lease the mill from Wealden District Council with the aim of restoring it to working order. A high-profile fundraising campaign was launched in 2011 to raise funds for the restoration and a substantial lottery grant obtained. Holes were engaged to restore the main structure of the mill and return the striking gear to working order, while volunteers tackled the replacement of the weatherboard on the mill itself, and the renovation of the roundhouse floor, walls and roof. These first two phases of the restoration project were successfully completed in 2016 when the mill's sweeps turned in the wind for the first time in over 80 years. Phase 3 of the restoration project is underway as of 2026. In September 2024 the fantail was rebuilt, but remains stationary. Restoration of the internal machinery is the next major aim.
