= Walter's Mill, Mark Cross =

Tower mill at Mark Cross, Sussex, England

Mark Cross Windmill
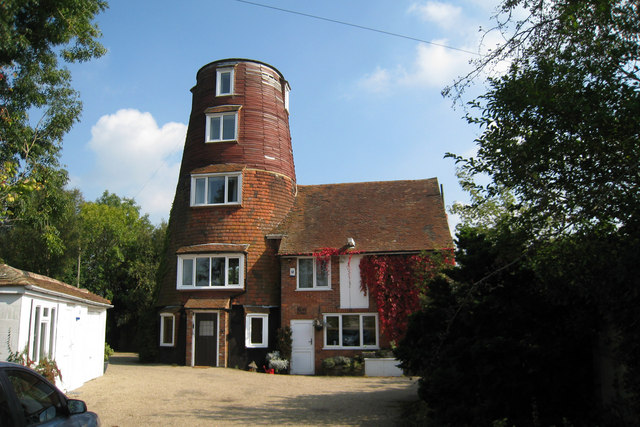
- The converted mill

Origin
- Mill name: Walter's mill
- Mill location: TQ 585 315
- Coordinates: 51°03′40″N 0°15′36″E
- Operator(s): Private
- Year built: c1845

Information
- Purpose: Corn mill
- Type: Tower mill
- Storeys: Five storeys
- No. of sails: Four sails
- Type of sails: Patent sails
- Winding: Fantail
- Auxiliary power: Gas engine
- No. of pairs of millstones: Two pairs

Walter's Mill is a tower mill at Mark Cross, Sussex, England which has been converted to residential accommodation.

== History ==
Walter's Mill was first mentioned in 1845 and is thought to have been built by the Arnold brothers of Paddock Wood, Kent. The mill was working by wind until 26 July 1911, when it was burnt out. The mill was refitted and driven by a gas engine, at that time having a crenellated top, which was removed in the early 1930s. the mill building was converted and extended to form a house in 1962. In 2005, it was announced that the owners planned to rebuild the cap and sails, and return the mill to a more traditional appearance in the long term.

== Description ==
Walter's Mill is a five-storey tile-hung brick tower mill. It had four Patent sails. The Kentish-style cap was winded by a fantail. The mill drove two pairs of underdrift millstones. The converted tower stands today, with the window and door openings having been enlarged during the conversion.

== Millers ==
- Catherine Ashby 1845
- Walter Dunk 1855 - 1856
- Edward J Walter and Sons 1887
- Edward and Joseph Walter 1903
- Joseph Walter and Son 1905
- Joseph Walter and Sons 1913
- Wealden Farmers Ltd 1930s

References for above:-
