= St Leonard's Mill, Winchelsea =

Windmill in Winchelsea, East Sussex, England

Winchelsea Windmill
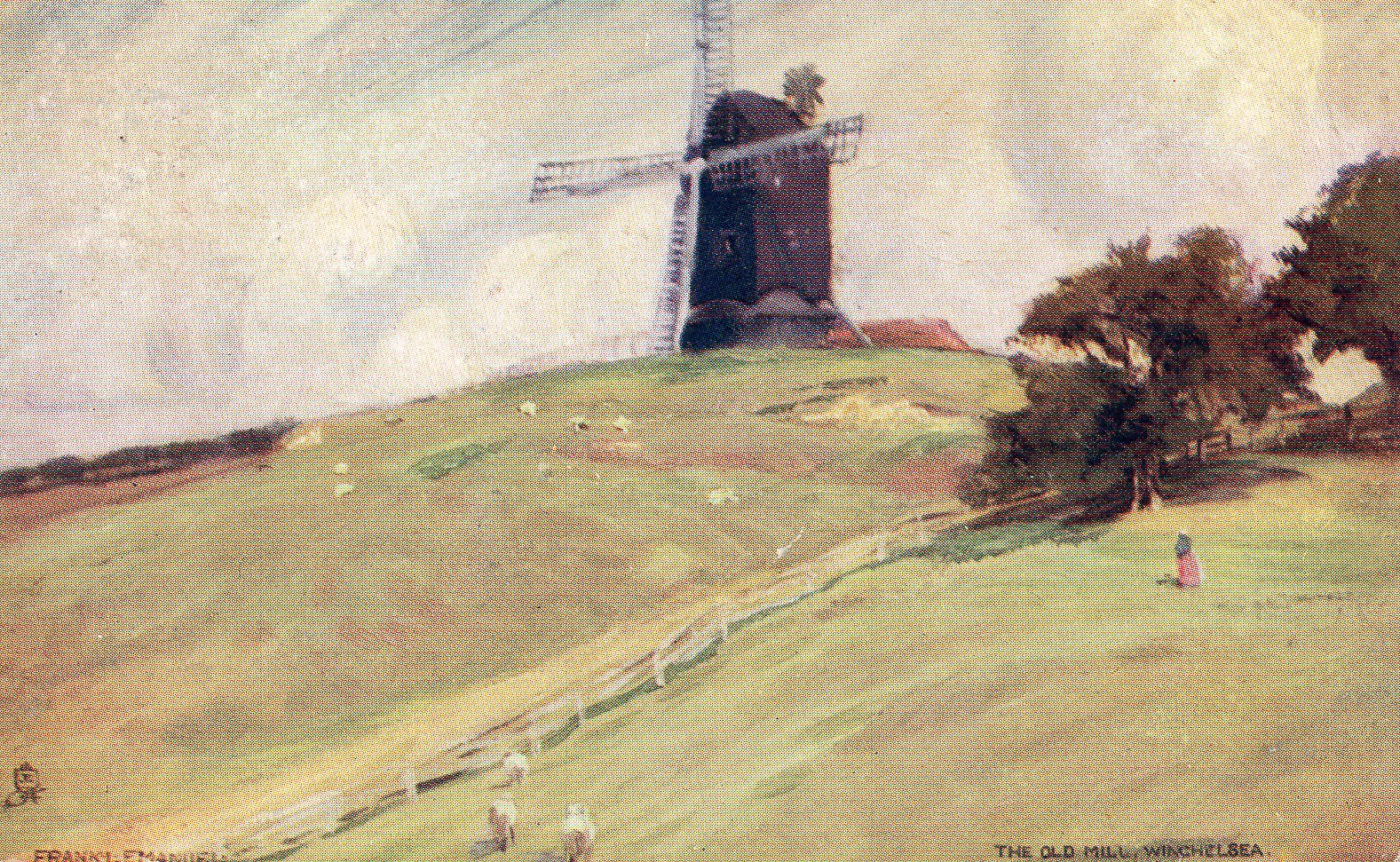
- The mill c1905

Origin
- Mill name: St Leonard's Mill
- Mill location: TQ 902 176
- Coordinates: 50°55′34″N 0°42′18″E
- Year built: 1760 (moved 1823)

Information
- Purpose: Corn mill
- Type: Post mill
- Roundhouse storeys: Single storey roundhouse
- No. of sails: Four sails
- Type of sails: Two Spring sails and two Common sails
- Windshaft: Wood
- Winding: Roof mounted fantail
- Fantail blades: Eight blades
- No. of pairs of millstones: Two pairs, Head and Tail
- Year lost: 1987

St Leonard's mill was a post mill at Winchelsea, East Sussex, England which was blown down in the Great Storm of 1987.

== History ==
St Leonard's Mill was built in 1760, originally standing in Iham. It was shown at that site on the 1808 Ordnance Survey map, and was still there in 1813. By 1823 the mill had been moved to the new site, which was on the remains of St Leonard's church. An accident when fitting a new stock to the mill in 1861 resulted in the death of Benjamin King, millwright. The mill was working until the 1890s and was derelict by the 1920s. It was repaired in 1935 and dummy sails fitted, which did not last long. The mill was again repaired in 1955. The National Trust became custodians of the mill in 1975. In February 1978, the back of the mill was blown out in a gale. The windmill was blown down on the morning of 16 October 1987. The wreckage of the mill was still to be seen on site the following March. One of the millstones was salvaged and used in the restoration of Lowfield Heath Windmill. The site of the windmill is now marked by Winchelsea's Millennium Beacon.

== Description ==
St Leonard's Mill was a post mill with a single storey roundhouse, It was winded by a roof mounted fantail. The mill had two Spring sails and two Common sails carried on a wooden Windshaft. The mill was the last in Sussex to retain a wooden windshaft without an iron poll end, this had been removed by 1935. Two pairs of millstones were arranged Head and Tail, with a third pair underdriven by a belt, this from an Upright Shaft which was driven by the tail wheel.

== Millers ==
- J Sharps, 1861
