= Heritage Mill, North Chailey =

Windmill in Sussex, England

North Chailey Windmill
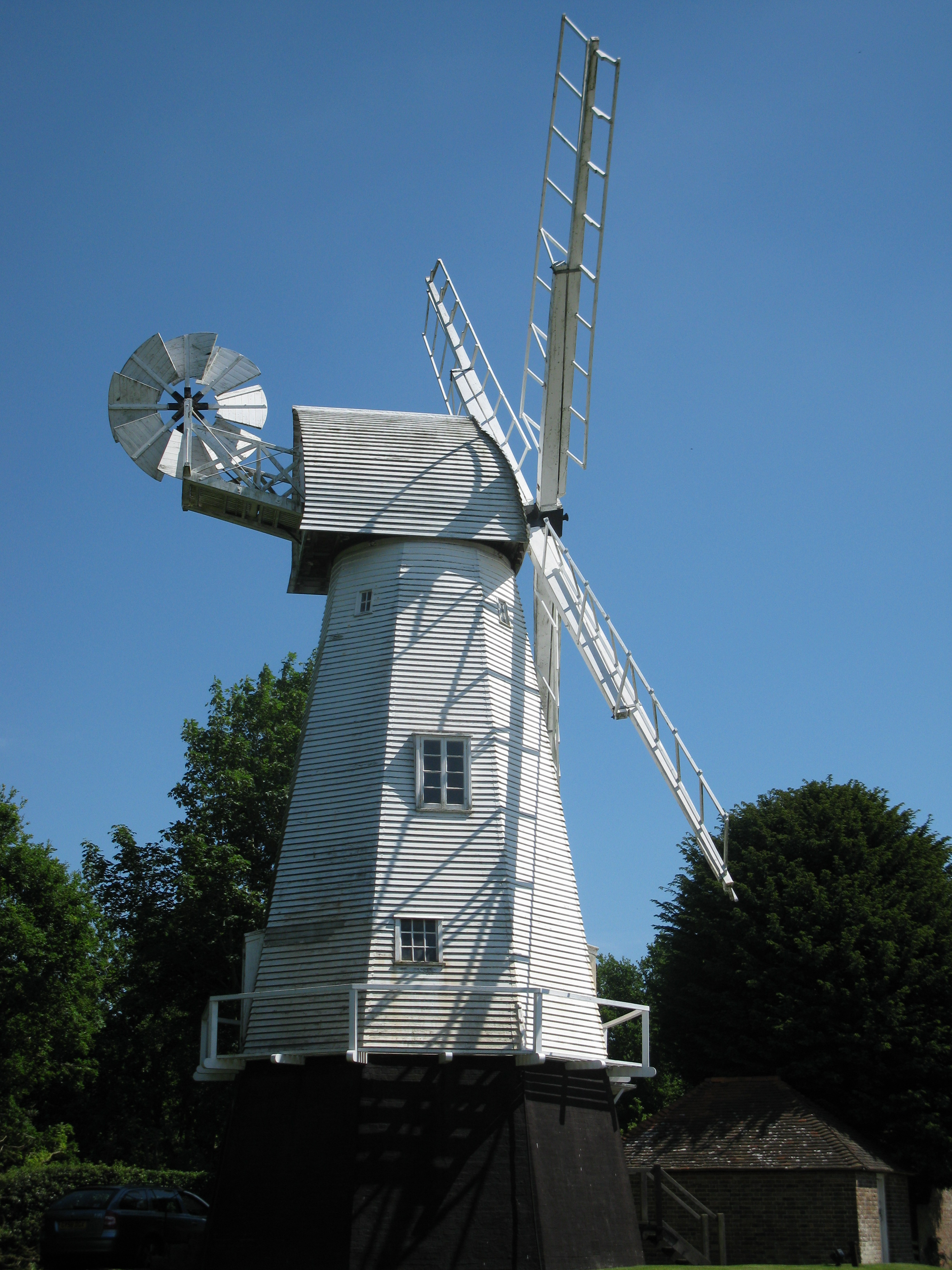
- The mill in 2009
- Interactive map of North Chailey Windmill

Origin
- Mill name: Heritage Mill; Beard's Mill
- Mill location: TQ 386 214
- Coordinates: 50°58′30″N 0°01′37″W
- Operator: Chailey Heritage Mill Trust
- Year built: Mid-19th century

Information
- Purpose: Corn mill
- Type: Smock mill
- Storeys: Three-storey smock
- Base storeys: Single-storey base
- Smock sides: Eight sides
- No. of sails: Four sails
- Type of sails: Patent sails
- Windshaft: Cast iron
- Winding: Fantail
- Fantail blades: Eight blades

Heritage Mill, or Beard's Mill is a grade II listed smock mill at North Chailey, Sussex, England, which is maintained as a landmark and open to the public.

== History ==
A windmill was first recorded at this site in 1596.Heritage Mill, the seventh on this site, was built in 1830 at Highbrook, West Hoathly, where she was known as Hammingden Mill. In 1844 she was moved to Newhaven, replacing a mill that had burnt down. She was made redundant by the erection of a steam mill and was moved again, this time to her current location at Chailey, replacing a post mill. This second move was done by Medhurst, the Lewes millwright. Heritage Mill was working by wind until 1911.

In 1928 the mill was tailwinded, and the cap and sails were blown off. The mill was restored in 1933. The work was done by Neve's, the Heathfield millwrights. A few years later, the mill was tailwinded again, and this time the windshaft snapped between the Brake Wheel and canister. Neve's installed the windshaft from Punnetts Town Windmill, which had been partly dismantled in 1935.

== Description ==
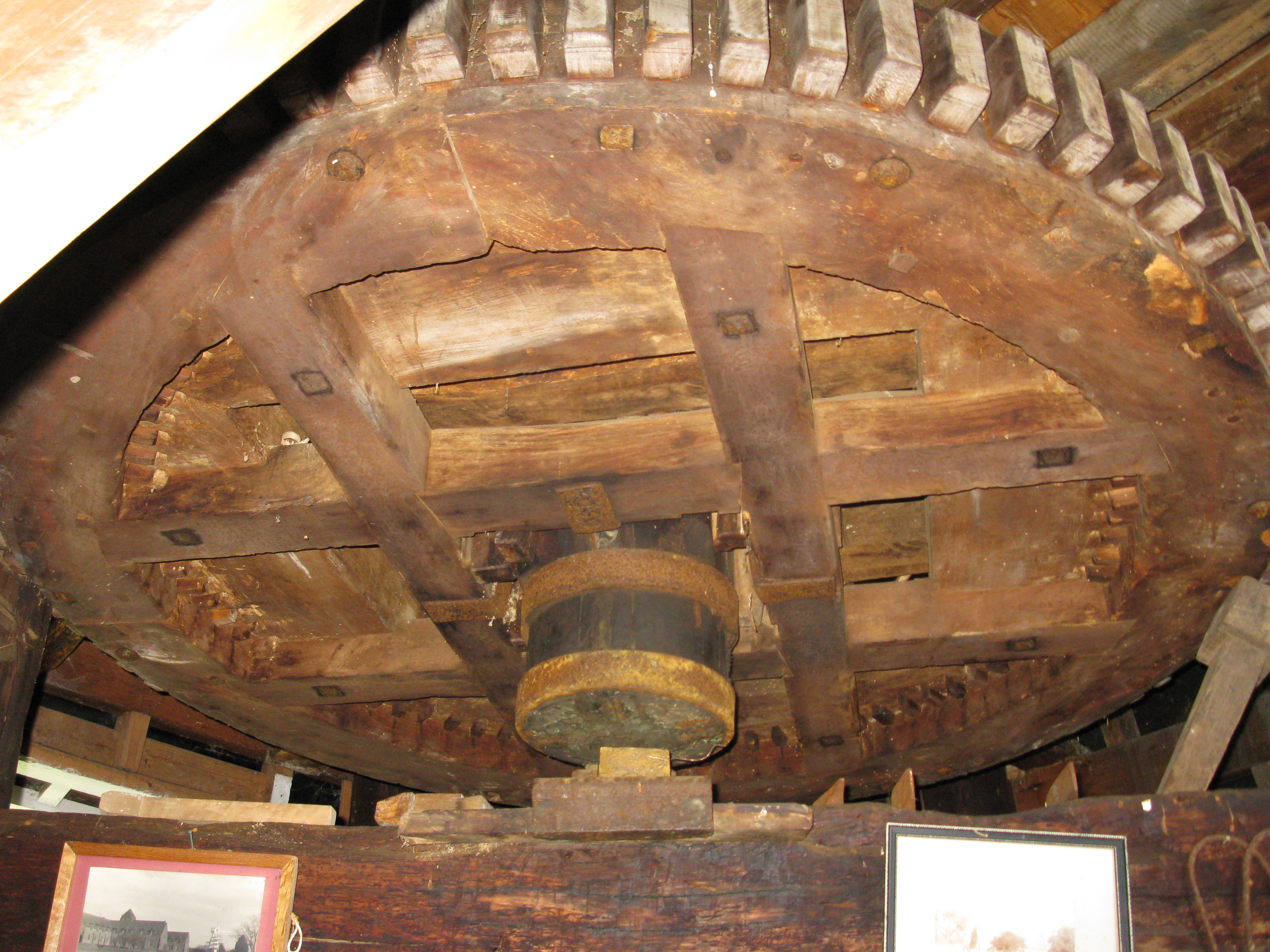
The great spur wheel

Heritage Mill is a three-storey smock mill on a single-storey brick base. It has a Kentish-style cap winded by a fantail. When working it had four Patent sails carried on a cast-iron windshaft. The only machinery remaining is the clasp arm great spur wheel.

== Millers ==
- John Arnold 1841(Hammingden)
- Bollen 1844 (Newhaven)
- Messrs Stone & Towner – 1864 (Newhaven)
- Godley
- Thomas Comber
- H K Wallis 1870
- A G Sparkes 1874
- Lockyer 1878–1911

References for above:-
