= Lowfield Heath Windmill =

Grade II listed windmill in the United Kingdom

Lowfield Heath Mill
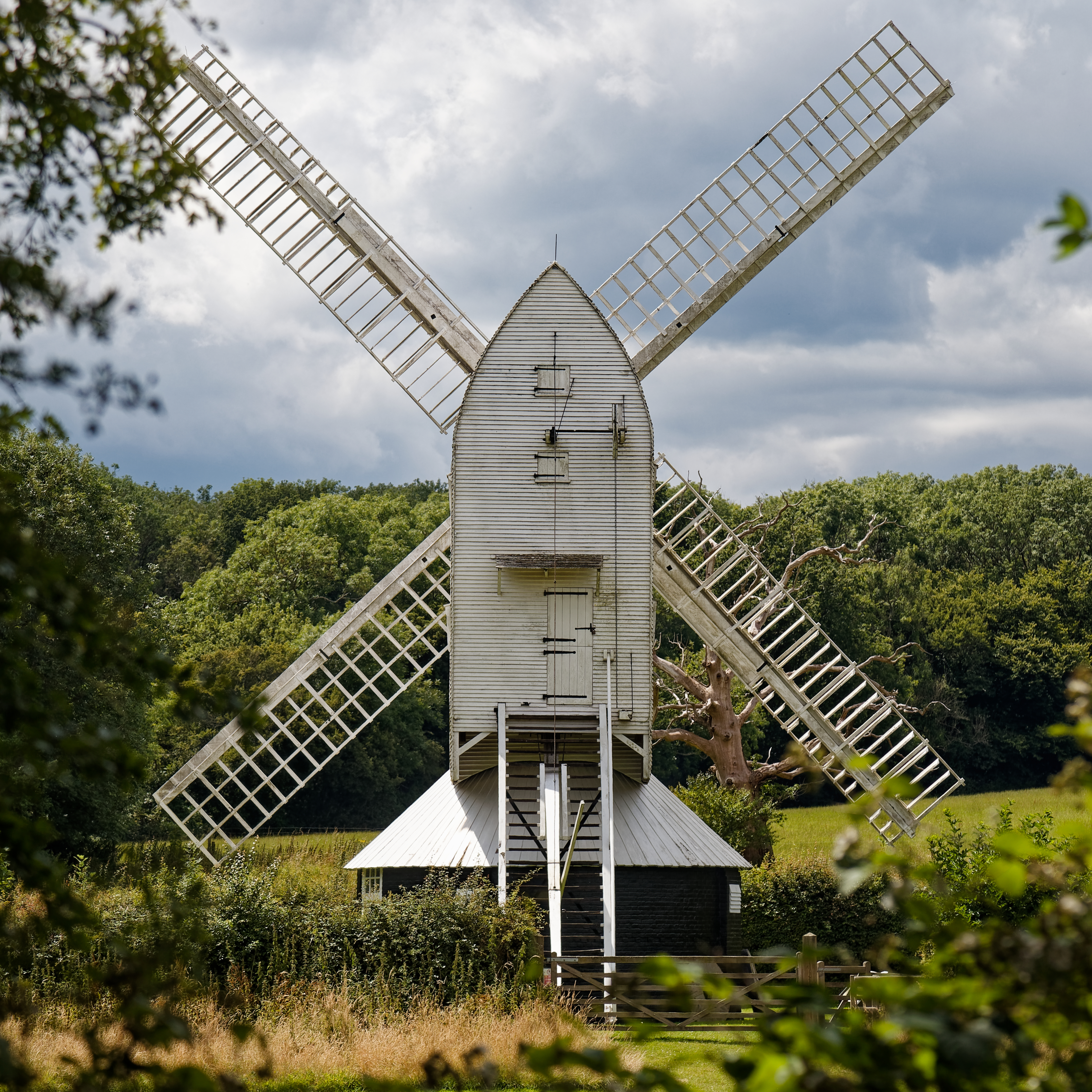

Origin
- Mill name: Lowfield Heath Mill
- Mill location: TQ 2347 4072
- Coordinates: 51°09′09″N 0°14′10″W
- Operator(s): Lowfield Heath Windmill Trust
- Year built: 1989

Information
- Purpose: Corn mill
- Type: Post mill
- Roundhouse storeys: Single storey roundhouse
- No. of sails: Four sails
- Type of sails: patent sails, common sails
- Windshaft: Cast iron
- Winding: Tailpole
- No. of pairs of millstones: Two pairs, Head and Tail

Lowfield Heath Windmill is a Grade II listed post mill at Charlwood, Surrey, England, which has been restored to working order.

== History ==
The Lowfield Heath Windmill was originally built at Lowfield Heath (TQ 271 398 51°08′38″N 0°11′08″W). Its origins are uncertain, a rumour that it was moved from Hookwood in the 1760s is not borne out by the facts. There is no record of a windmill there before 1820. Another rumour is that it was moved from Horsham, Sussex in 1738, but again proof is lacking. The mill was marked on maps dated 1762, 1777, 1789, 1823 and the early Ordnance Survey maps. In 1827 the miller failed to obtain an injunction preventing the enclosure of the common that the mill stood on. The mill was damaged in a storm on 29 November 1835. The mill was last worked by wind in 1880, and was worked until at least 1895 by a portable steam engine.

By the 1930s the mill had been fitted with four dummy sails, much shorter and narrower than the originals. In 1957, the mill was derelict, with the roundhouse roof gone and the rear two-thirds of the roof missing. In January 1964, work was done to protect the mill, with further work being done to the mill between 1965 and 1971. In 1974, the mill temporarily became a Sussex windmill. In 1984, a Trust was formed with the intention of restoring the mill. Problems with access and concerns that the mill was threatened with demolition due to the expansion of Gatwick Airport led to the decision to move the mill to a new site on land adjoining Gatwick Zoo. The dismantling of the mill was started in June 1987 and by September there was nothing to be seen of the mill at Lowfield Heath. The rebuilding of the trestle and roundhouse started in 1988 and the mill rebuilt during the summer of 1989. The mill was officially opened on 10 April 1990 by Princess Alexandra. The roundhouse was completed in 1991. In 1997, work was started to put the mill back into full working order. The two bedstones were in the mill, but the runner stones had been removed to Iford, Sussex after the last miller retired there. The runner stone from the Peak stones was retrieved, and a French Burr stone was salvaged from Winchelsea mill, which had collapsed in the Great Storm of 1987. A new sack hoist was constructed, based on that at Reigate Heath windmill. New sails were fitted and the restored mill turned by wind for the first time on 26 June 1998. The Zoo closed in 2001 and houses were built on the site. A 2 acres (0.81 ha) plot of land that the mill stands on was left undeveloped. In 2003, the sails were damaged in a storm, and a new pair of Common sails were fitted. A new bolter was constructed, based on the one in Keston mill. In September 2004, the surviving machinery from Jolesfield windmill was acquired by the Trust. The restoration of the mill was funded by the Heritage Lottery Fund, Surrey Archaeological Society, Sussex Archaeological Society, the Science Museum, the English Tourist Board and Gatwick Airport.

== Description ==
Lowfield Heath Windmill is a post mill with a single storey roundhouse. Winding is by tailpole. It originally had four Common sails, and was last worked with four Patent sails carried on a cast iron Windshaft. The mill drives two pairs of millstones arranged Head and Tail. The Head Wheel is 9 feet (2.74 m) diameter with 111 cogs and the Tail Wheel is 8 feet (2.44 m) diameter with 100 cogs. The body of the mill is 20 feet (6.10 m) by 11 feet (3.35 m) in plan. The mill now carries one pair of Patent sails and one pair of Common sails.

== Millers ==
- Parker 1827
- William and Charles Constable 1842
- John Ansell 1848-1880
- Joseph Henry Robinson 1882–1895

References for above:-

== Public access ==
The mill is open on the last Sunday of each month, and also National Mills Day and the Heritage Open Weekend.
