= Alfriston Windmill =

Windmill in Sussex, England

Alfriston Mill
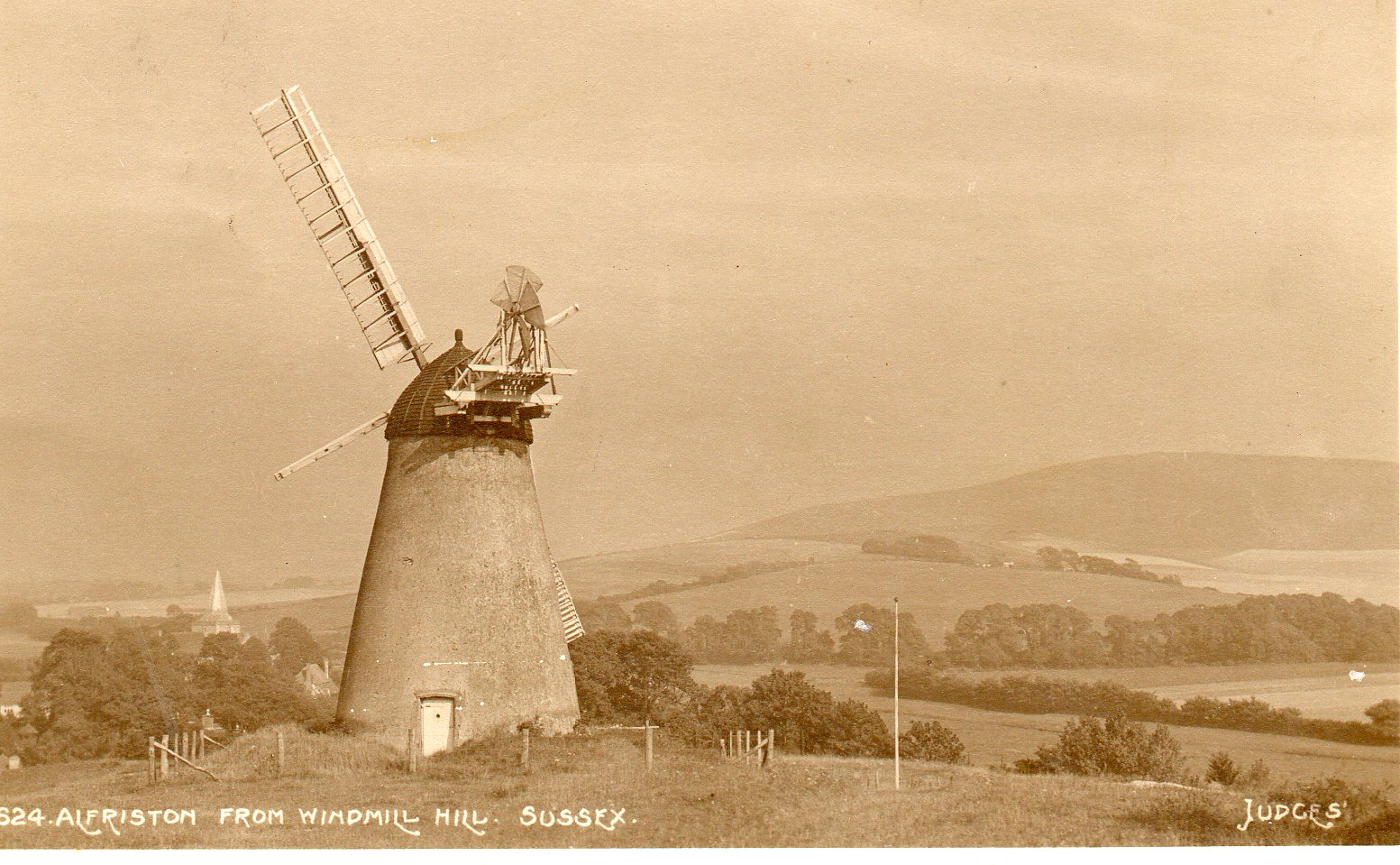
- Alfriston Mill c1905

Origin
- Mill name: Alfriston Mill
- Mill location: TQ 518 027
- Coordinates: 50°48′14″N 0°09′11″E
- Operator(s): Private
- Year built: 1834

Information
- Purpose: Corn mill
- Type: Tower mill
- Storeys: Three storeys
- No. of sails: Four sails
- Type of sails: Spring sails
- Winding: Fantail
- Fantail blades: Six blades
- No. of pairs of millstones: Two pairs

Alfriston Windmill is a tower mill at Alfriston, Sussex, England which has been converted to residential accommodation.

== History ==
Alfriston Windmill was built in 1834. The mill was working until 1905 when a sail was damaged by a cow. The mill worked for another two years on two sails. In 1908, the mill was stripped of machinery, and had been converted into a house by 1910.

== Description ==
Alfriston Windmill is a three-storey brick tower mill. It had four Spring sails and the beehive cap was winded by a fantail. The mill drove two pairs of underdrift millstones. All that remains today is the tower, with various additions and extensions.

== Millers ==
- Richard Saxby, 1834
- Daniel Sudbury, 1845
- William Shoesmith, 1855 - 1866
- Thomas Harvey, 1866 - 1874
- Thomas Fennell, 1881
- George Hewitt, 1907
