= Punnett's Town =

Village in East Sussex, England

Coordinates: 50.95982°N 0.31326°E

Punnetts Town
- B2096

- Location within East Sussex
- Area: 0.4657 km^{2} (0.1798 sq mi)
- Population: 608 (2021 census)
  - Density: 1,306/km^{2} (3,380/sq mi)
- Civil parish: Heathfield and Waldron; Warbleton
- District: Wealden
- Shire county: East Sussex
- Region: South East
- Country: England
- Sovereign state: United Kingdom
- Police: Sussex
- Fire: East Sussex
- Ambulance: South East Coast

Punnetts Town is a village in the civil parishes of Heathfield and Waldron and Warbleton, in the Wealden district of East Sussex. The main street is Battle road, which is part of the B2096 road. Blackdown Mill is a grade II listed smock mill which has been restored. In 2021 it had a population of 608.
