= West Blatchington Windmill =

Structure in Brighton and Hove, East Sussex, England

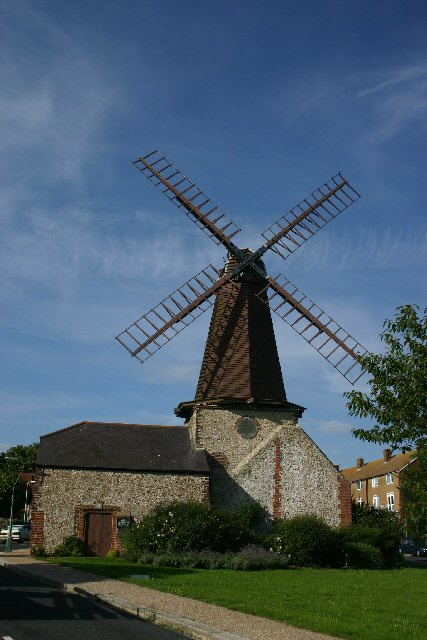
- The mill in 2002

Origin
- Mill name: West Blatchington Mill
- Mill location: TQ 279 068
- Coordinates: 50°50′49″N 0°11′06″W
- Operator(s): Friends of Blatchington Windmill
- Year built: c1820

Information
- Purpose: Corn mill
- Type: Smock mill
- Storeys: Three-storey smock
- Base storeys: Three-storey base
- Smock sides: Six sides
- No. of sails: Four sails
- Type of sails: Patent sails
- Windshaft: Cast iron
- Winding: Fantail
- No. of pairs of millstones: Two pairs

West Blatchington Windmill is a Grade II* listed smock mill at West Blatchington, Brighton and Hove, in the historic county of Sussex, England which has been restored and is open to the public.

== History ==
West Blatchington Windmill was built in the 1820s, first appearing on Greenwood's map of 1823. It was painted by John Constable in 1825. The mill is hexagonal in plan, whereas most smock mills are octagonal. She was working until 1897, when two sails were damaged. In 1937, the mill was acquired from the Marquess of Abergavenny by Hove Corporation, and has been maintained as a landmark. Repairs were done to the mill by Neve's, the Heathfield millwrights in 1937.

The windmill was listed at Grade II* on 24 March 1950. As of February 2001, it was one of 70 Grade II*-listed buildings and structures, and 1,218 listed buildings of all grades, in the city of Brighton and Hove.

== Description ==
As built, West Blatchington Windmill is a three-storey smock mill on a three-storey brick base, with a stage at third-floor level. In 1825 she had four Common sails but latterly was worked with four Patent sails. These were carried on a cast-iron Windshaft, mounted on a cross, similar to the Lincolnshire practice. The mill is fitted with Holloway's screw brake. The cap is in the Kentish style, winded by a fantail. The mill drove two pairs of underdrift millstones. The mill stood at the junction of three barns, one of the original barns remains standing today, and one of the others was replaced with a new build barn in 1997. Most of the machinery was removed in 1937, leaving the Brake Wheel and Upright Shaft.

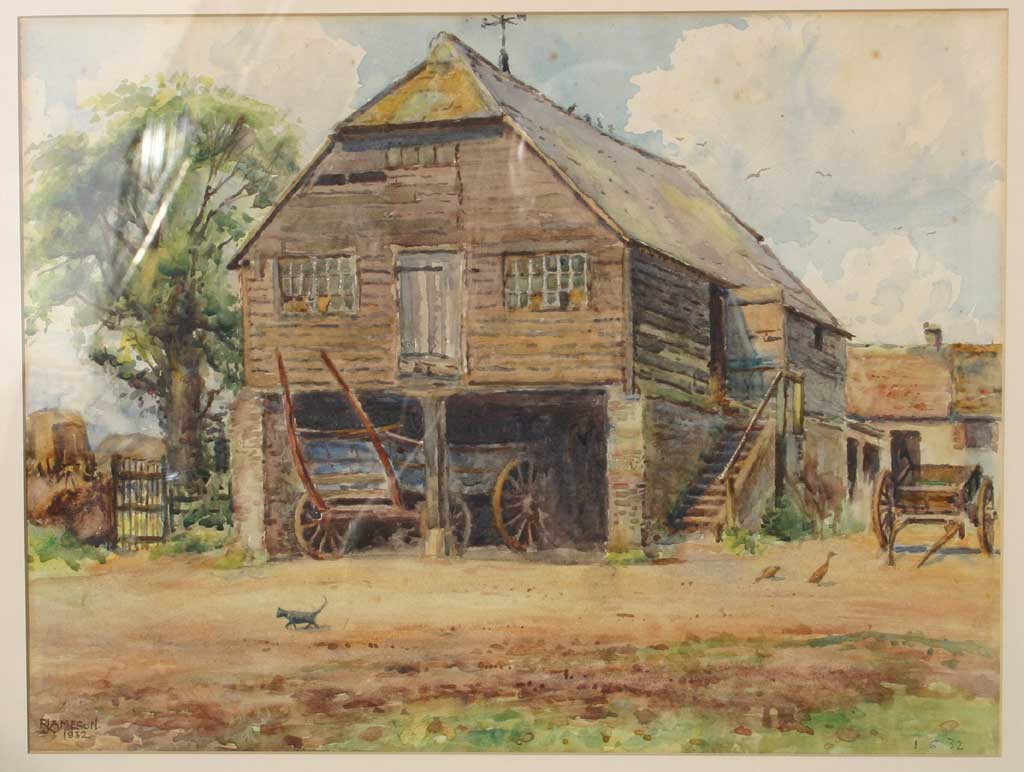

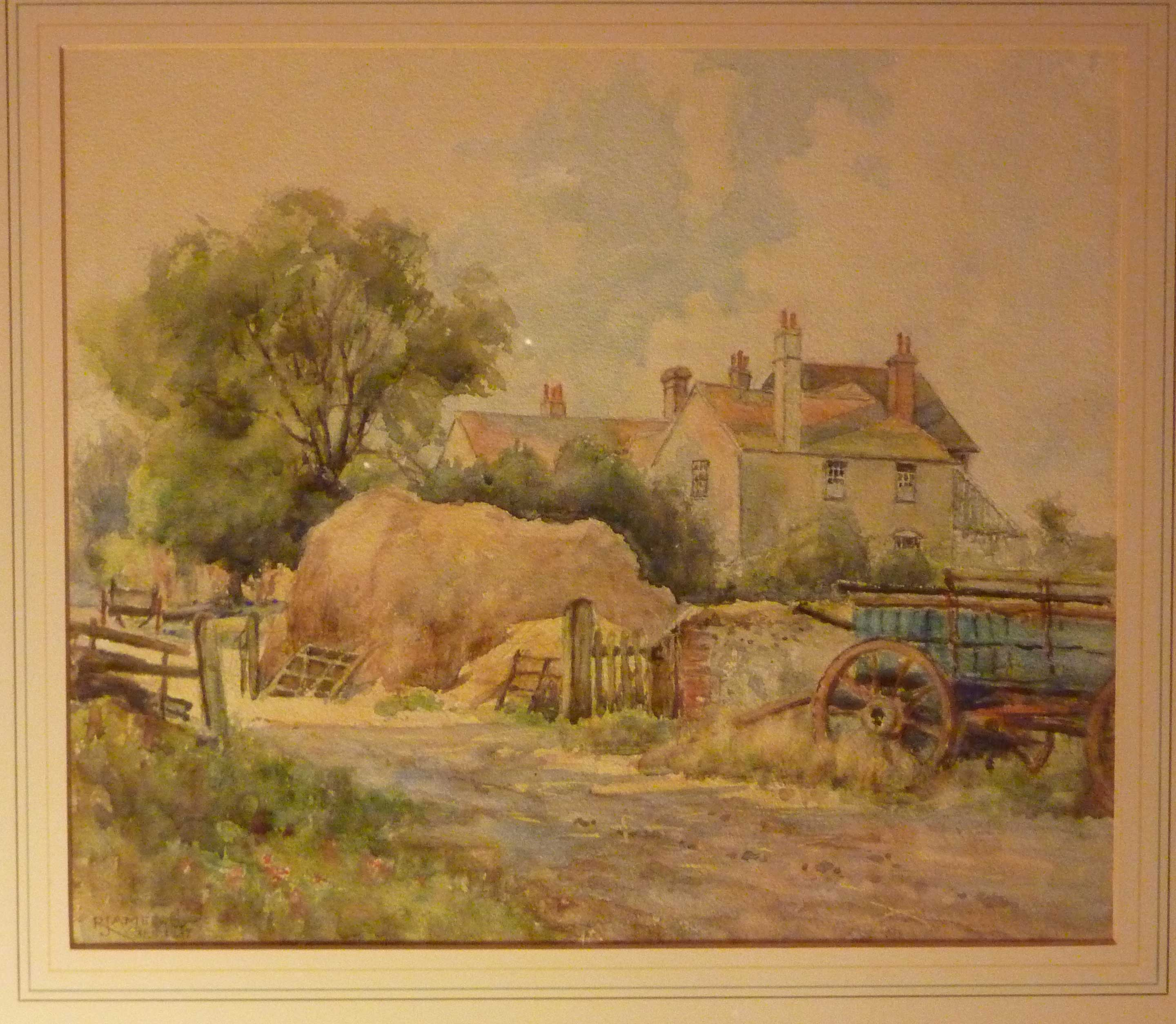

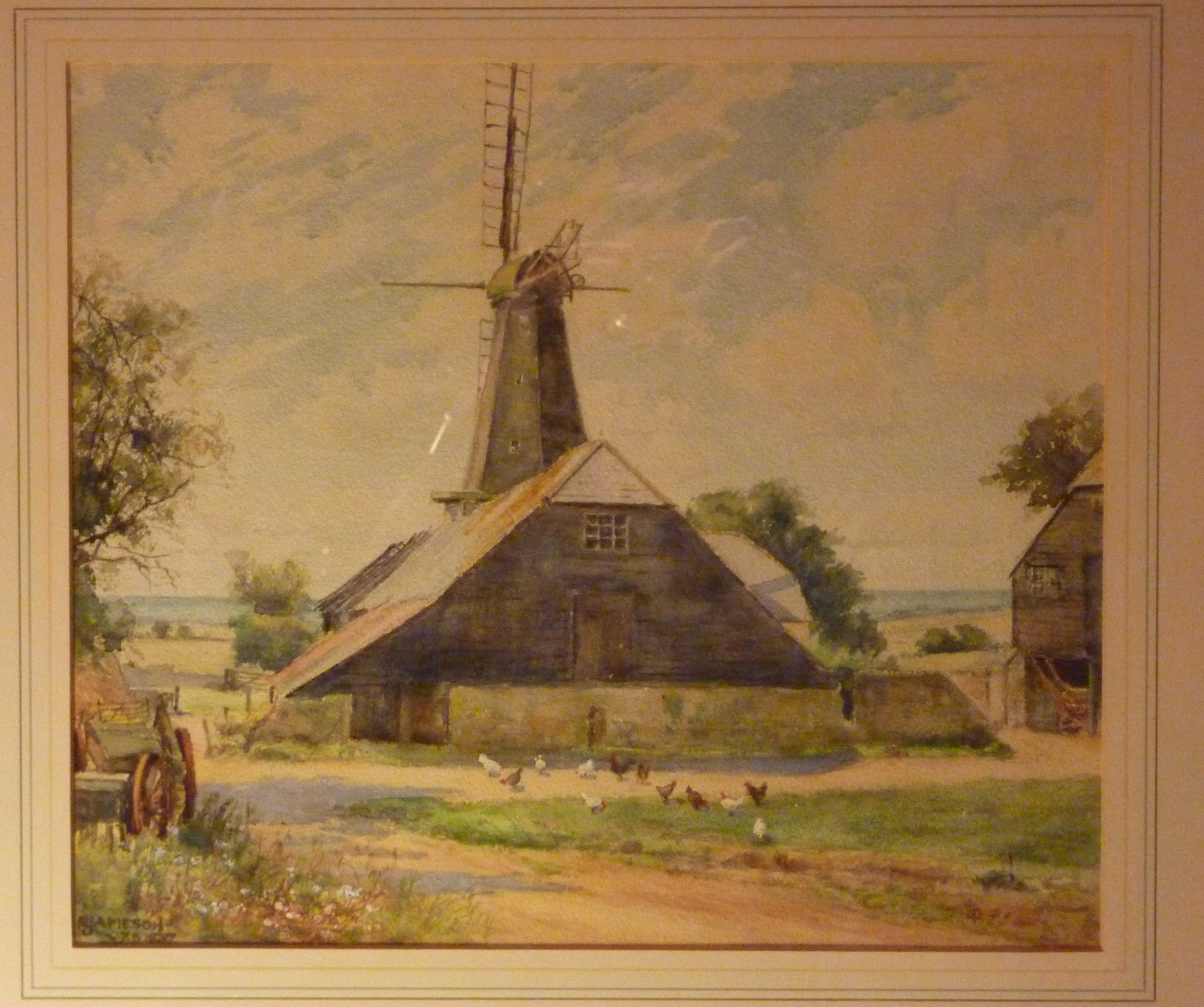

These four watercolours were painted in 1937 by R Jameson. At the time the mill was on a farm that was being run by tenant farmers Arthur and Helen Paul.

== Millers ==
- Hodson - 1887
- John Brown - 1887
- Whittington - 1897
