= Seaford Museum =

Local history museum in Seaford, England

Coordinates: 50.767°N 0.104°E

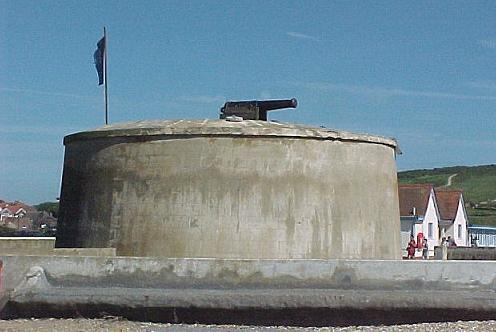
Martello Tower on Seaford seafront, housing the Museum

The Seaford Museum and Heritage Society is a local history museum located at the Martello Tower in East Sussex, England. It was established in 1979 and contains objects, archives and displays relating to the history of the local area. The museum reopened in 2026.

== The Museum ==
Seaford Museum is housed in Tower number 74 and is situated on the Esplanade in Seaford, East Sussex. The Tower is the most westerly of a line of defensive fortifications built along the Kent and Sussex coast during the Napoleonic Wars. The Tower is a round two-storey structure surrounded by a dry, brick-lined moat. It was constructed between 1806 and 1810.

The War Department sold it in 1880. During the next 90 years it passed through a number of hands and was used for various commercial purposes. During the 1930s the moat floor was used as a roller skating rink while the tower was used as a cafeteria.

In 1976 the Tower was acquired by Lewes District Council and the Museum was installed there in 1979. The Museum has 5,000 square feet (500 m^{2}) of floorspace (including a covered section of the moat) which is used for displays, a visitor centre, an archive and a museum shop. From November to March it is open on Saturday and Sunday afternoons and Bank Holidays only. During the rest of the year it is additionally open on Sunday mornings and Wednesdays. Public access to the document archive is available, on a supervised basis, once per month.

The museum is run as a registered charity by the Seaford Museum and Heritage Society and has a large and eclectic collection of artifacts including large collections of maritime and domestic items. Improvements to the museum in 2018 were made to allow step free access to the main exhibition areas.

The museum will reopen in 2026 after a renovation.

== Role in the community ==
British soldiers parade in the Moat, 2006 heritage event

The Museum acts as a centre for a number of heritage and community activities. The Round Table, the local model railway club and various other organisations hold events there.

The Museum is also used as a venue for public lectures and a start point for guided tours to places in the locality. The Museum also provides a talk and short video and for schools on the 1986 successful sea defence scheme involving a controversial beach reclamation which has prevented breaches of the sea wall and flooding of the adjacent areas ever since.
