= Ashcombe Mill, Kingston =

Windmill in East Sussex, England

Ashcombe Mill
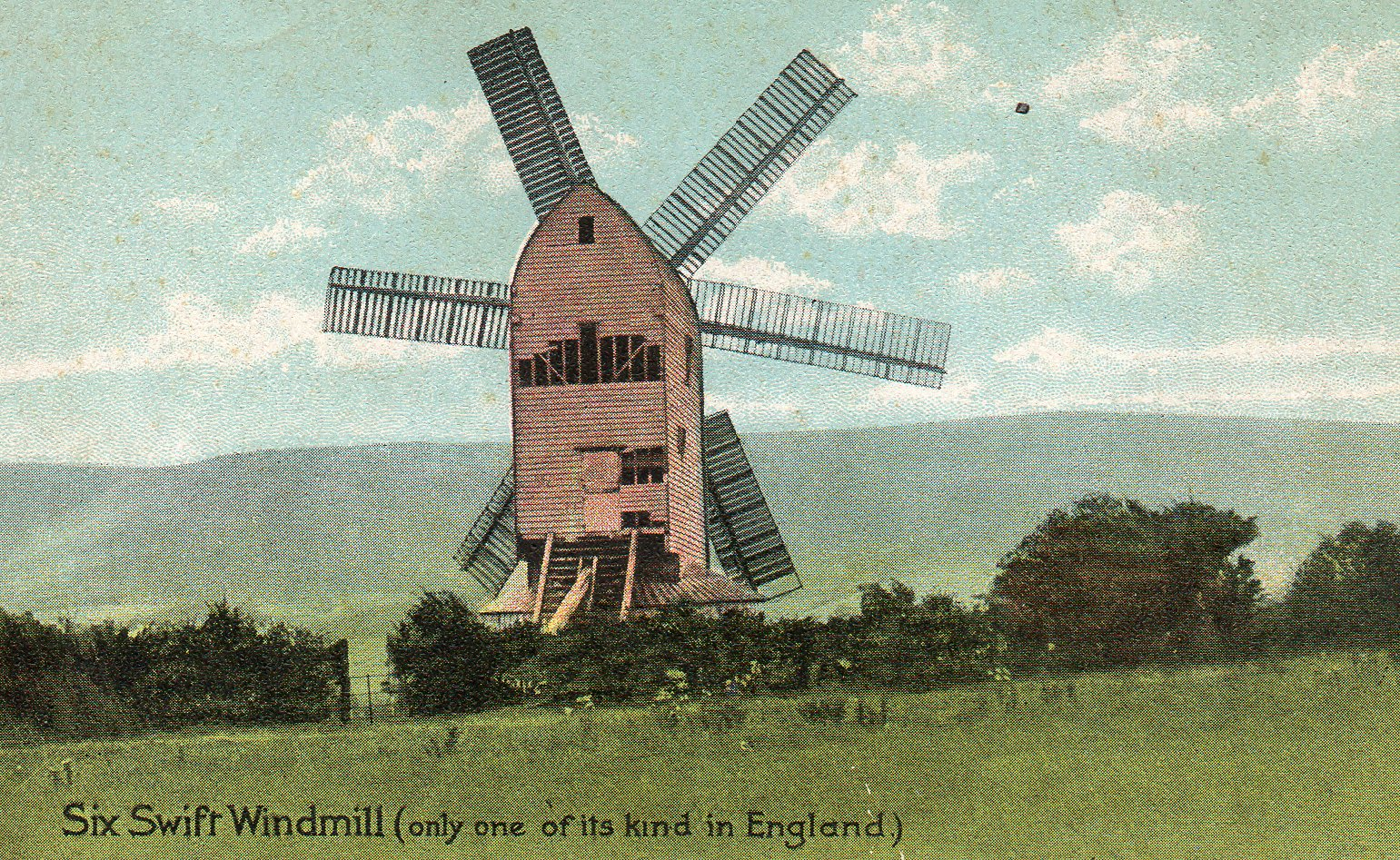
- Original Ashcombe Mill

Origin
- Mill location: TQ 392 089
- Coordinates: 50°51′47″N 0°01′23″W
- Year built: 1828

Information
- Purpose: Corn mill
- Type: Post mill
- No. of sails: Six sails

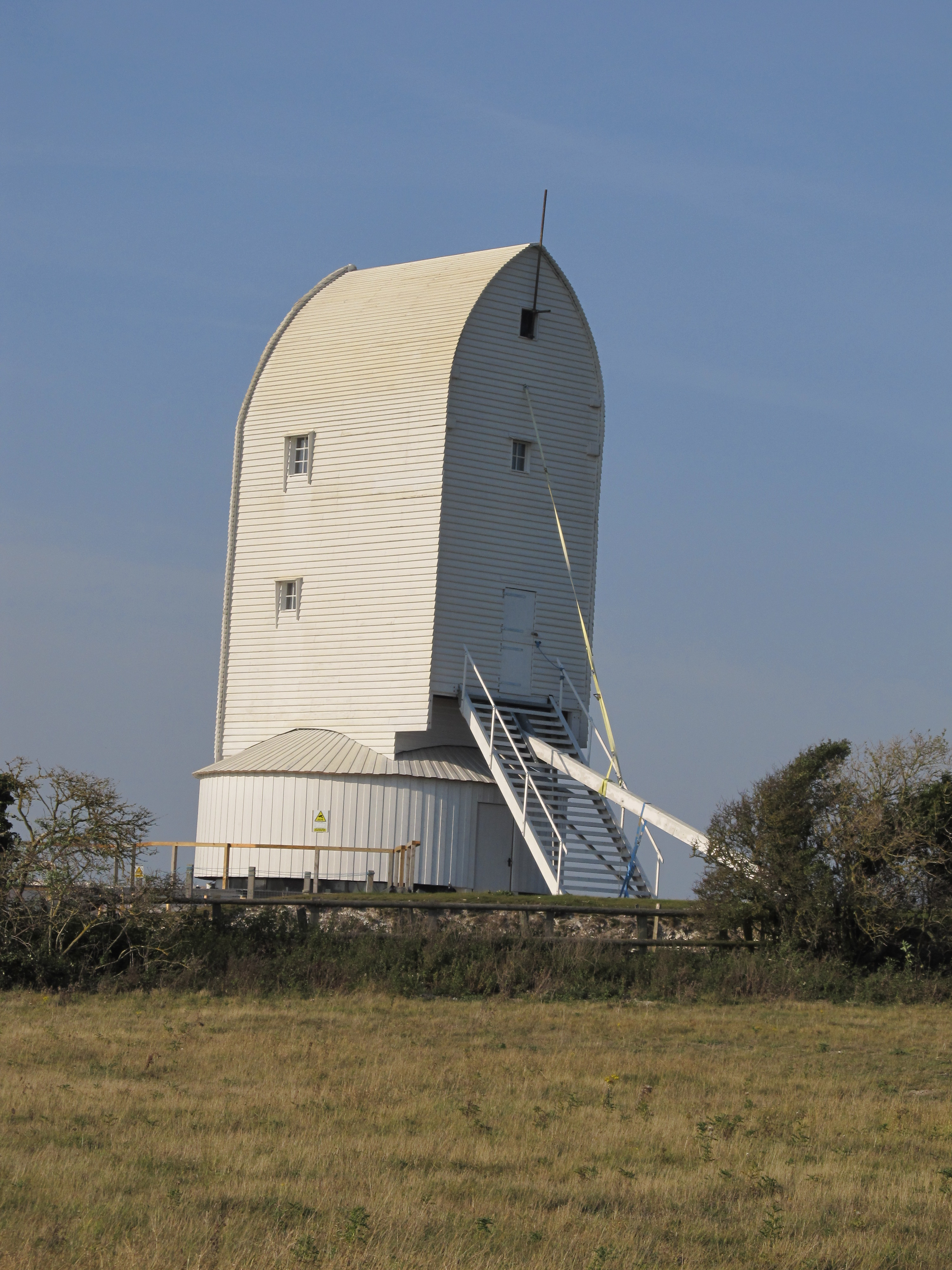
The reconstructed mill in 2011

Ashcombe Mill was a post mill near the village of Kingston near Lewes, East Sussex, England. It was built in 1828 on Kingston ridge to the east of the village, probably by the millwright Samuel Medhurst of Lewes, who was responsible for building several other windmills in the area. That original mill was destroyed during a gale in 1916.

In 2007 planning permission was granted to Sussex Mills Group to reconstruct a facsimile of the original mill as residential accommodation on the same site on condition that the new building would be environmentally friendly and be used to generate electricity for the National Grid. It is planned, nevertheless, to furnish the mill with one pair of grindstones. The surplus electricity will be equal to the consumption of three houses.

A steel frame was constructed in early 2009 and the wooden cladding attached later in the year. By the end of 2010 the tailpole and rear steps had been fixed, the whole structure painted white and the mill turned on its axis for the first time.
