= Blackdown Mill, Punnetts Town =

Grade II listed windmill in Punnett's Town, East Sussex, UK

Punnetts Town Windmill
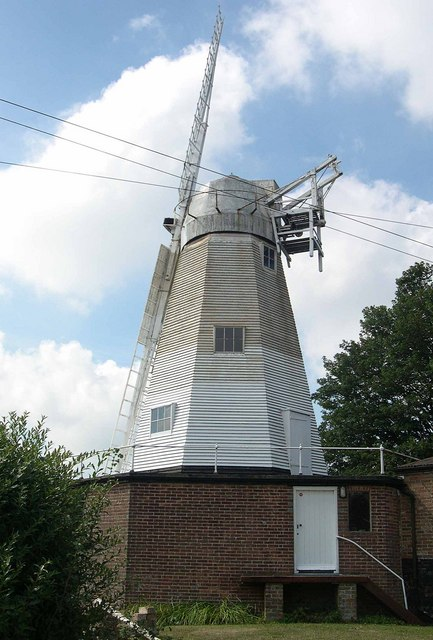
- The mill in 2006

Origin
- Mill name: Punnett's Town Mill; Cherry Clack Mill
- Mill location: TQ 627 209
- Coordinates: 50°57′54″N 0°18′58″E
- Operator(s): Private
- Year built: 1859

Information
- Purpose: Corn mill
- Type: Smock mill
- Storeys: Three-storey smock
- Base storeys: Single-storey base
- Smock sides: Eight sides
- No. of sails: Four Sails (Two Missing)
- Type of sails: Common sails
- Windshaft: Cast iron
- Winding: Fantail
- Fantail blades: Six blades
- Auxiliary power: Engine
- No. of pairs of millstones: Two pairs, a third pair driven by engine

Blackdown Mill or Cherry Clack Mill is a grade II listed smock mill at Punnetts Town, East Sussex, England, which has been restored.

== History ==
Blackdown Mill, was originally built at Three Chimneys, Cranbrook, Kent. She was dismantled and moved to Punnetts Town in 1859 to replace a post mill that had burnt down. The original mill was referred to as Cherry Clack Mill in the 1851 census, when Demas Dallaway was the miller. The move was done by Neve's, the Heathfield millwrights. The mill was working by wind until the 1920s, when the mill became unable to turn to wind because of a broken curb. The mill was stripped of machinery and the cap and sails removed by Neve's in 1933.

In 1946, Archie Dallaway decided to restore the mill back to working order. A new cap, of a different design to the original was built. A new fantail fitted, and the windshaft from Staplecross Mill, which was demolished in 1951, was installed. Four new sails were made and fitted in 1972. Two pairs of millstones were installed, one pair coming from a watermill at Polegate. A third pair of stones was added later.

== Description ==
Blackdown Mill is a three-storey smock mill on a single-storey brick base. It originally had Kentish-style cap, winded by a fantail. When last working for trade she had four patent sails. The mill drove two pairs of overdrift millstones, with a third pair worked by engine. A saw was also worked by the mill.

As restored, a beehive cap clad in aluminium is now carried, and the sails are now common sails. The sails are 26-foot-6-inch (8.08 m) long and 5-foot-3-inch (1.60 m) wide. The cap is winded by a 6 feet (1.83 m) diameter fantail. The cast-iron windshaft carries an 8-foot-4-inch (2.54 m) diameter oak brake wheel, which drives the original cast-iron wallower on a cast iron upright shaft. The great spur wheel is a replacement, built by Mr Dallaway. Three pairs of millstones are driven overdrift. Recent photos show that the mill is missing two sails and the fantail.

In 2016, high winds set the restoration back as the new mast snapped.

== Millers ==
- Samuel Dallaway 1859 - 1876
- Dallaway Brothers (Charles, Thomas and John) 1876 - c.1910
- Demas Dallaway 1910 - 1933
- Archie Dallaway 1946 -

References for above:-
