= Ovenden's Mill, Polegate =

Windmill in Polegate, East Sussex, England

Polegate Windmill
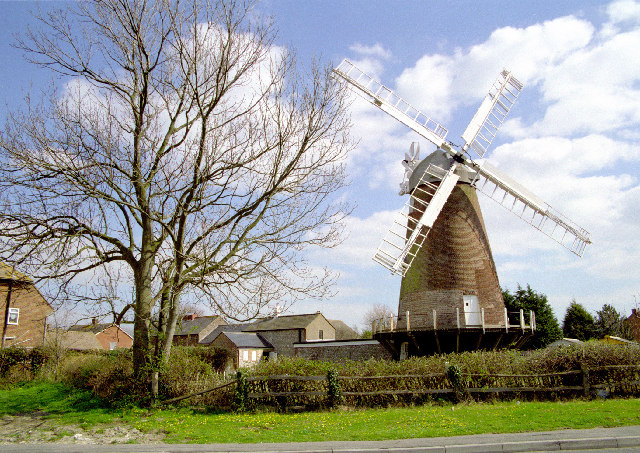
- The mill in 1997

Origin
- Mill name: Ovenden's Mill; Mockett's Mill
- Mill location: TQ 582 041
- Coordinates: 50°48′54″N 0°14′38″E
- Operator: Private
- Year built: 1817

Information
- Purpose: Corn mill
- Type: Tower mill
- Storeys: Four storeys
- No. of sails: Four sails
- Type of sails: Patent sails
- Windshaft: Cast iron
- Winding: Fantail
- Fantail blades: Six blades
- Auxiliary power: Engine
- No. of pairs of millstones: Two pairs, a third pair driven by engine

Ovenden's Mill or Mockett's Mill is a grade II* listed tower mill at Polegate, East Sussex, England which has been restored but is now in a poor state and the tower is not open to the public. The impressive milling museum is open but only on certain Open Days. If you look at the "Polegate windmill" Facebook page you will find more details. We are arranging these days at the moment but the first one should be National Mills weekend with the mill open on the Sunday.

== History ==
Ovenden's Mill was built in 1817 and was working by wind until 1943. The mill was worked by auxiliary engine, latterly an electric motor, until 1965. By the time the mill stopped working, it was becoming derelict. Eastbourne and District Preservation Trust bought the mill and grounds, and a restoration was carried out by E Hole and Sons, the Burgess Hill millwrights. One of the new stocks broke in July 1974, bringing the sail with it. This particular stock was only seven years old. Thompson's, the Alford millwrights fitted a replacement stock and two new sails in May 1976. Further restoration work was undertaken in 2004, including the fitting of a cowl to the adjoining malthouse. Two new sails were fitted in 2009.

== Description ==
Ovenden's Mill is a four-storey brick tower mill with a domed cap winded by a fantail. There is a stage at first floor level. It had four Patent sails carried on a cast iron Windshaft. The Brake Wheel is wooden. The mill drove two pairs of overdrift millstones, with a third pair driven underdrift by auxiliary engine. The tower is 45 feet (13.72 m) high to the curb.

== Millers ==
- Joseph Seymour 1817–1857
- Mathias Mockett 1857–
- George Thomas
- Ephraim Ovenden 1918–
- Albert Ovenden – 1965

References for above:-
