= Windmill Hill Mill, Herstmonceux =

Windmill in East Sussex, England

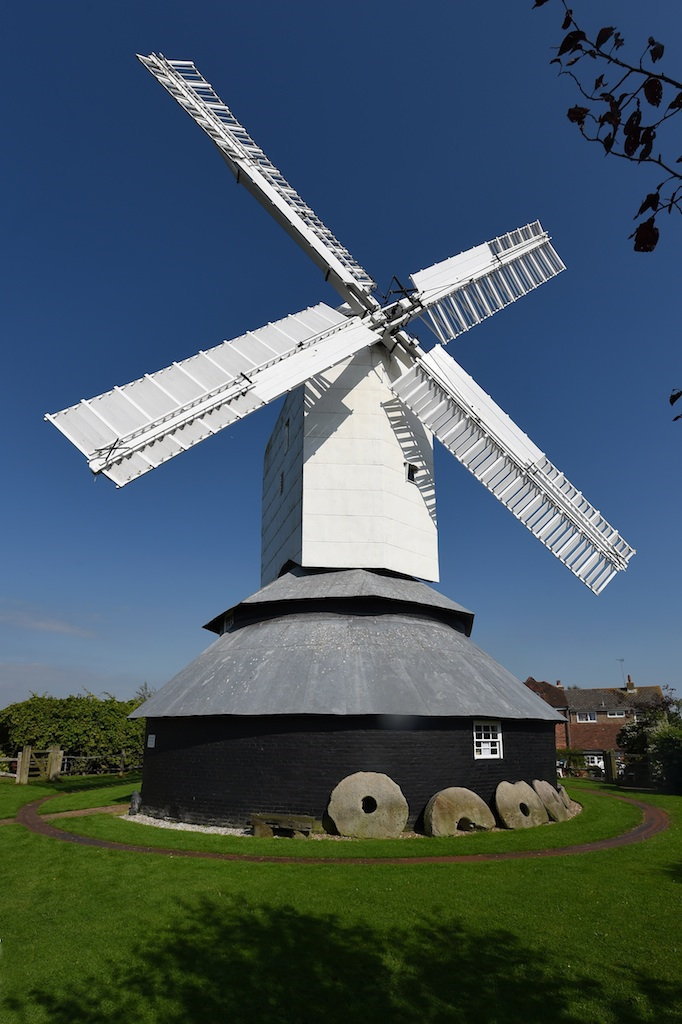
- The windmill at Windmill Hill, 2018
- Interactive map of Windmill Hill Mill, Herstmonceux

Origin
- Grid reference: TQ 648 122
- Coordinates: 50°53′10″N 0°20′31″E
- Year built: ca. 1814

Information
- Purpose: Corn mill
- Type: Post mill
- Roundhouse storeys: Two storey roundhouse
- No. of sails: Four
- Type of sails: Patent sails
- Windshaft: Cast iron
- Winding: Originally Tailpole, now by computer controlled battery powered electric motor
- No. of pairs of millstones: Two pairs, arranged Head and Tail
- Other information: Largest post mill in Sussex. Only surviving example of Hammond's Patent Sweep Governor is fitted to this mill.

Windmill Hill Mill is a grade II* listed post mill at Herstmonceux, Sussex, England which has been restored and now operates as a working mill. The mill is open to the public on most Sundays from Easter until October.

== History ==
Windmill Hill Mill was built c. 1814 by William Medhurst, the Lewes millwright. It was working by wind until 1893, when it was stopped owing to a weak weatherbeam. It is the largest post mill in Sussex, and is unique in that it is fitted with Hammond's Patent Sweep Governor, a feature previously fitted to Jack Mill, Clayton.

After work by wind had ceased, milling was continued by means of a steam-powered mill set up in the roundhouse. Neve, the Warbleton millwright was responsible for the fitting-out of the roundhouse as a power mill. The mill stood derelict for many years with major structural faults, including both side girts being broken.

== Restoration ==
In 1994, a supporting steel framework was placed around the mill, and the remaining iron sheeting that clad the breast and sides of the mill removed. The tail of the mill was clad in plywood to keep the weather out. A trust was set up in 1995, aiming to prevent further deterioration in the condition of the mill, and to assess options for restoration. The Heritage Lottery Fund agreed in principle to support the restoration work. English Heritage funded the study to produce an application for lottery funds to restore the mill. A detailed study of the mill was made in the summer of 2000. IJP Millwrights of Binfield Heath were contracted to restore the mill. A grant of £570,000 towards a total restoration cost of £770,000 was made in December 2001, this being the biggest single Lottery grant to an individual windmill. The mill was dismantled during November and December 2003, and taken in sections to IJP's workshops. Modern millwrighting techniques, including CAD were used in the assessment of the structure of the mill in preparation for the rebuild. It was found that one of the quarterbars in the trestle would need to be replaced due to damage done by Death Watch Beetles.

The rebuilt frame of the mill was lifted back onto the main post on 7 September 2004. The sails were fitted to the mill between 24 November and 3 December 2005.

On 19 November 2014 the Heritage Lottery Fund announced the grant of £80,800 for restoration of machinery and sweeps to grind flour. On 5 November 2015, the full patent sweeps turned again for the first time in 120 years.

== Description ==
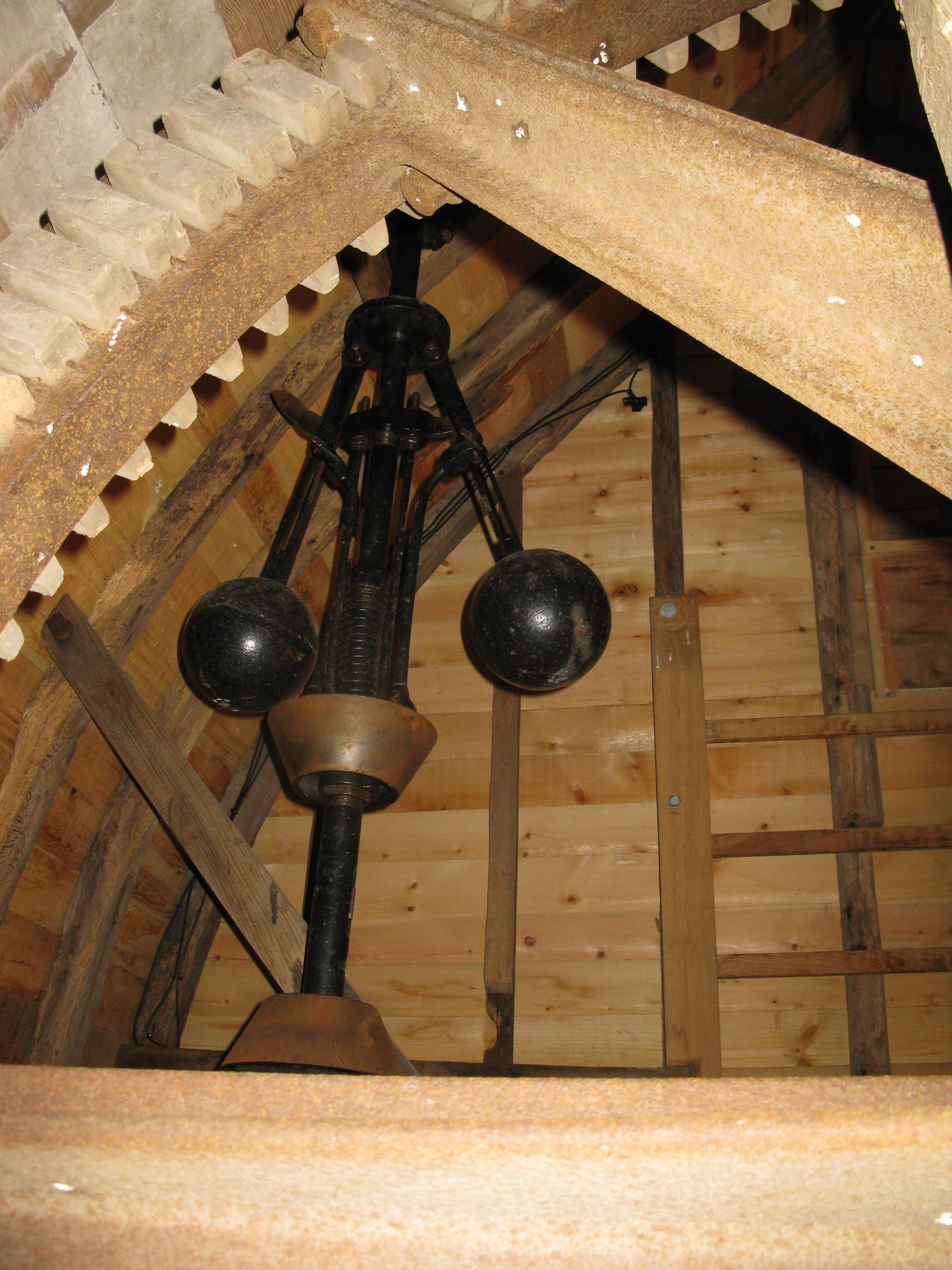
Hammond's Sweep Governor

Windmill Hill Mill is a post mill on a two-storey roundhouse. She has four patent sails carried on a cast-iron windshaft and was winded by a tailpole. Winding is now computer-controlled, with an automatic turning device installed that receives information about the wind direction from sensors mounted on the mill. The wooden brake-wheel is of clasp-arm construction, with oak arms and an elm rim. It has 104 cogs and drives a stone nut with twelve cogs. The tail wheel is of cast iron, with 130 cogs. The mill drove two pairs of millstones, arranged head and tail. The headstones are Peak stones and the tailstones are French Burrs. The body of the mill is 21 feet 3 inches (6.48 m) long and 12 feet 3 inches (3.73 m) wide, the largest surviving post mill by floor plan in the United Kingdom. It is 50 feet 10 inches (15.49 m) high to the roof, the second tallest post mill in England. The roundhouse is 22 feet 6 inches (6.86 m) in diameter and has a single-storey lean-to extension of part of its circumference. When originally built, the mill had a single-storey roundhouse which was raised in the 1850s. The Hammond's Sweep Governor was fitted in the 1870s.

== Millers ==
- Beeney, 1845 - 1877
- Charles Edwin Hammond, 1878 - 1887
- Henry Harmer, 1887 - 1913
