= Rotherfield =

Village in East Sussex, England

Coordinates: 51.04601°N 0.21916°E

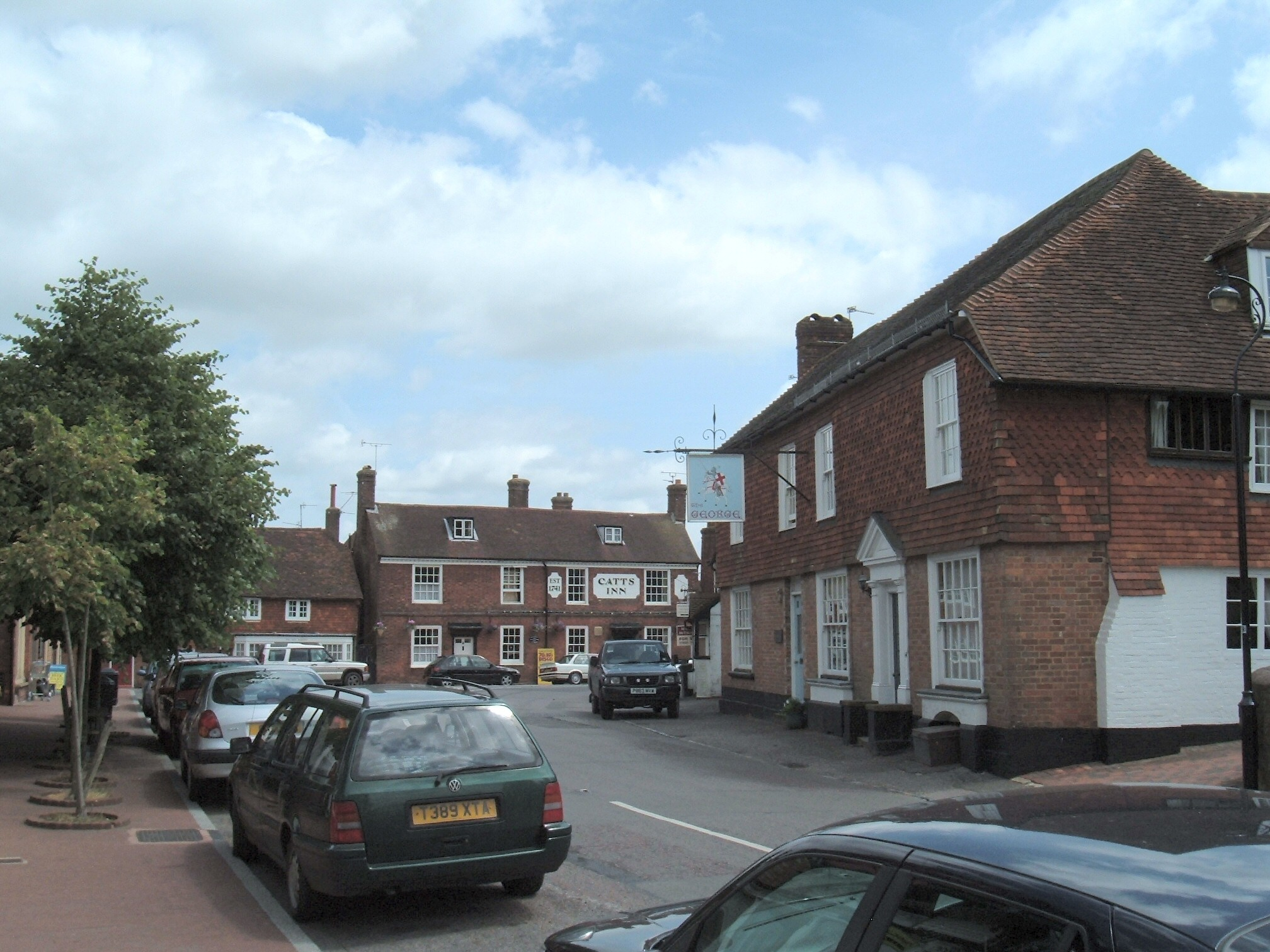
- High Street, Rotherfield

- Location within East Sussex
- Area: 46.1 km^{2} (17.8 sq mi)
- Population: 3,208 (2011 census)
  - Density: 177/sq mi (68/km^{2})
- OS grid reference: TQ556297
  - London: 35 miles (56 km) NNW
- District: Wealden
- Shire county: East Sussex
- Region: South East
- Country: England
- Sovereign state: United Kingdom
- Post town: CROWBOROUGH
- Postcode district: TN6
- Dialling code: 01892
- Police: Sussex
- Fire: East Sussex
- Ambulance: South East Coast
- UK Parliament: Sussex Weald
- Website: Rotherfield Parish Council website

Rotherfield is a village and civil parish in the Wealden District of East Sussex, England. It is one of the largest parishes in East Sussex. There are three villages in the parish: Rotherfield, Mark Cross and Eridge. The River Rother, which drains much of the county and discharges at Rye Harbour, has its source on the south side of the hill on which Rotherfield village is built.

== Etymology ==
The name Rotherfield is thought to derive from the Anglo-Saxon redrefeld meaning cattle lands, although it has been speculated that it may have originally been called or Hrytheranfelda meaning Hrother's field. On the south side of the hill on which the village of Rotherfield is built, the River Rother has its source. The main tributary of the River Arun in West Sussex has the same name, as does the river which runs through Rotherham, South Yorkshire.

== History ==
There are written records of Rotherfield in the 8th century; it was also in various other medieval documents and in the Domesday Book of 1086 as Reredfelle. The Anglo-Saxon (Old English) place-name Reredfelle translates to "cattle open land" or "pasture for horned cattle," which became Retherfeild by 1685, and eventually its modern placename Rotherfield. It was the location for the meeting of the hundred court and carrying out of sentences for the Hundred of Rotherfield.

In Tudor times three of the inhabitants were burned at the stake for their religious beliefs.

In the 18th century, the road through the village became part of the Turnpike Trust road between Tunbridge Wells and Lewes. Until 1880, when a new ecclesiastical parish was formed, Crowborough was also part of the parish; in 1905 the latter became a civil parish in its own right.

== Governance ==
The parish council consists of thirteen members, three representing the Eridge and Mark Cross ward and ten representing the Rotherfield Ward. This ward had a population of 2,433 at the 2011 Census.

== Landmarks ==
Rotherfield parish lies to the south of Tunbridge Wells in the High Weald, an Area of Outstanding Natural Beauty. Within the parish boundaries lies Bream Wood, a designated Site of Special Scientific Interest, comprising an area of woodland with a ghyll hosting several species of fern and moss not found elsewhere in the area.

The Rotherfield Millennium Green was set up in 2000. It is run by a group of volunteer trustees who manage it for the village.

Rotherfield has been designated as a conservation area because of the quality of the buildings, including the Grade I listed St Denys Church.

== The villages ==
=== Rotherfield ===
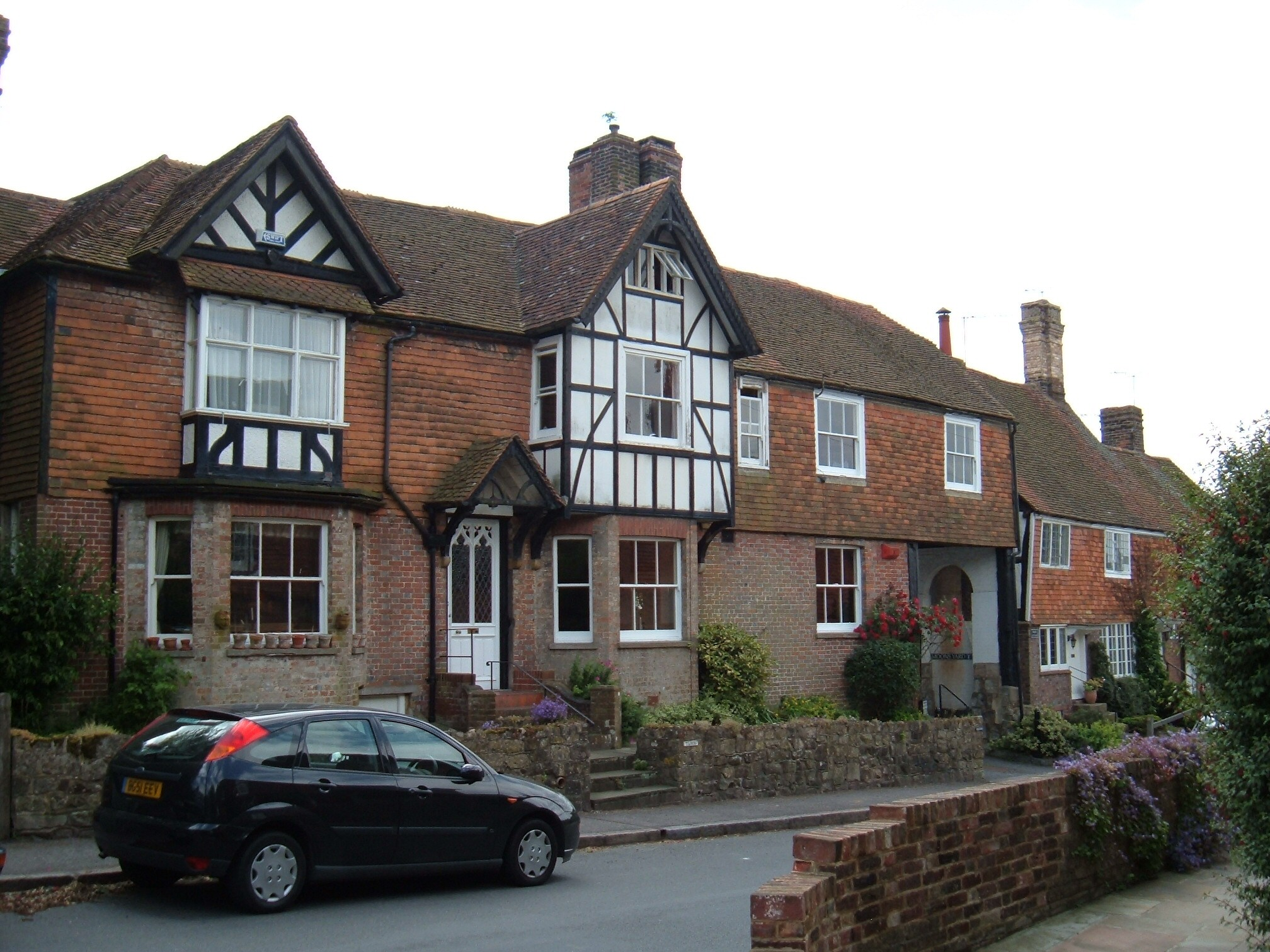
Cottages in the main street of Rotherfield

Rotherfield was originally a Saxon settlement in an area generally covered with oak forest. The church stands at the top of a hill, and was then surrounded by cleared land. The areas nearest to the valley bottoms, where water was available, were farmed. Rotherfield became a royal hunting estate in the times of Kings Alfred the Great, Æthelstan and William Rufus. It was the winner of the Calor East Sussex Village of the Year Award in 2007.

=== Eridge ===
Mark Cross village sign

Eridge (/ˈɛrɪdʒ/) or Eridge Green is a small village but not a civil parish: it is situated on a sandstone ridge in the northern borderlands of East Sussex next to Kent, having some publicly accessible woodland and trails with far-reaching views across the Kent and Sussex countryside. Although the village is in East Sussex, its post town of Tunbridge Wells is in the former postal county of Kent.

The name Eridge is thought to derive from 'Eagle ridge', or 'ridge frequented by eagles'. It is directly north of Rotherfield, and largely overlaps the ecclesiastical parish of Eridge Green. It was formed on 5 February 1856 out of parts of the former parishes of Frant, Rotherfield, Eridge Park and Eridge Castle, the latter being the seat of the Earl and Marquess of Abergavenny. On the village street is the church which is grade II listed, a mainline railway station (Eridge) and six other listed buildings including the public house, the Neville Crest and Gun. In 1792 Henry Nevill, 2nd Earl of Abergavenny converted the old Eridge House into a Gothic castle, which he named "Eridge Castle". It was replaced by a Neo-Georgian mansion in the 1930s after the original structure was badly damaged by fire. The area also contains several follies, including the Saxonbury Tower and several ornamental buildings near the Sham Farm business park. The undulating park and garden of Eridge Park is densely wooded to its north (Whitehill Wood) and south (Saxonbury Hill) and is highly rated (Grade II* listed) for its landscape.

The A26 road between Tunbridge Wells and Crowborough passes through the village.

=== Mark Cross ===
Mark Cross is located to the east of Rotherfield, at the junction of the A267 and B2100 Lamberhurst to Crowborough road. One notable residence is Walter's Mill, a house converted from a windmill.

=== Boarshead ===
Boarshead, a hamlet within the parish, developed around the A26 road between Crowborough and Eridge. Current amenities include an eponymous pub and a public golf course.

== Education ==
There are two primary schools in the parish: Rotherfield Primary School, located in North Street, and Mark Cross CE Primary School.

== Community projects ==
Rotherfield St Martin is a charitable organisation that provides social support and arranges activities to older adults in the area.

== Religion ==
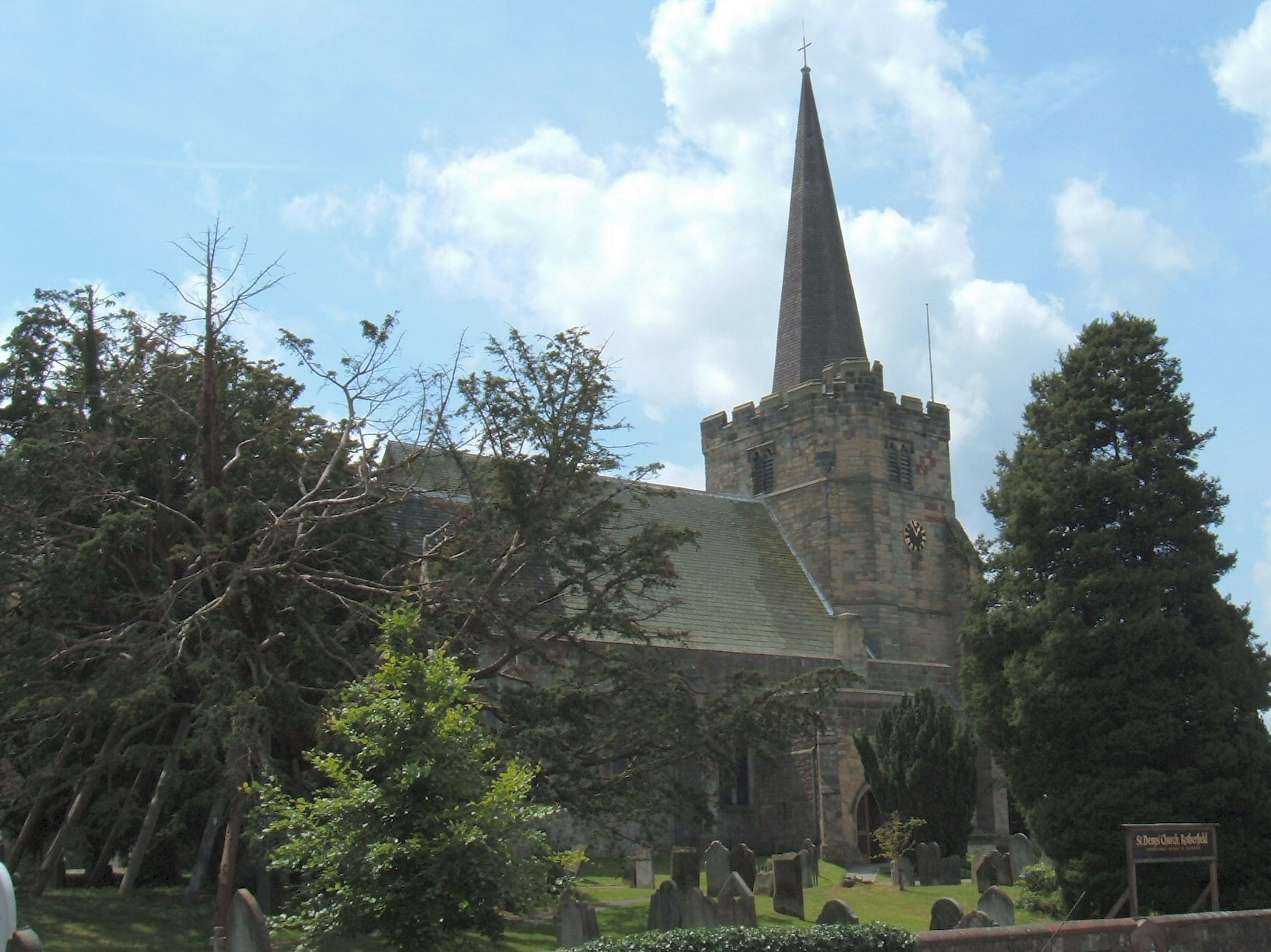
Church of St Denys

There are five churches within Rotherfield parish: Rotherfield's 11th-century parish church is dedicated to St Denys. A timber church was first built on the site in 792 AD, and the present sandstone church occupies the same site; the original church is believed to have been under the north-east corner of the current building, in the area now known as the Nevill chapel. The Nevill family were Lords of the Manor from 1450. The building was extended at various times, with the last major alteration being the addition of the tower, porch and spire in the 15th century. The original spire was destroyed by a storm in October 1987, and reconstructed using a steel frame raised to the roof by helicopter. Construction of the tower meant that a new porch and entrance had to be built on the north side of the nave, to replace the west door obstructed by the tower. A new west door was also built.

Also in Rotherfield are the Providence Chapel (Strict Baptist); and the Roman Catholic Church dedicated to St Peter, Prince of Apostles. A former Methodist chapel at Town Row, between Rotherfield and Mark Cross, was closed in the early 21st century.

The church in Mark Cross is dedicated to St Mark; that at Eridge Green, to the Holy Trinity.

== Transport ==
The A267 road between Tunbridge Wells and Eastbourne passes through the parish.

The one railway station still operating in the parish is at Eridge, served by Southern trains between Uckfield and London Bridge and since 2011 by the preserved Spa Valley Railway trains to Tunbridge Wells West. Until 1965 it was the junction for the cross-country railway to Hailsham, Polegate and Eastbourne.

The parish used to be served by Rotherfield and Mark Cross railway station on the Cuckoo Line which closed in 1965: It was situated adjacent to the B2100 road in the small village of Town Row about one mile east of Rotherfield. The former railway station is now a private house.

== Leisure, culture and sport ==
In the Eridge area lies one of several local sandstone outcrops used for climbing.

The village hosts two drama groups: Stage Door Drama School for young people and the Rotherfield Players.

The area has the following pubs: in Rotherfield, the Catts Inn and the Kings Arms; in Mark Cross, the Lazy Fox; and in Eridge, the Huntsman and the Nevill Crest and Gun.

The local recreation ground is home to Rotherfield Football Club who play in the Mid-Sussex Football League.

On the first Saturday in October, Rotherfield plays host to its annual carnival night organised by the Rotherfield and Mark Cross Bonfire Society. This is a torchlight procession through the village streets involving many other Sussex Bonfire and Carnival societies. This is an old Sussex tradition which predates the discovery of the Gunpowder Plot but is now part of the buildup to the celebrations in Lewes on Bonfire night. This is the biggest event the village holds per year, and often sees crowds of up to 3,500 people lining the streets. The climax of the evening is the bonfire and fireworks display. Money raised from the event is given to local charities.

== Twin towns ==
- Saint-Chéron, France

== Notable residents ==
- Richard Jefferies (1848–1887), writer, lived briefly at Rehoboth Villa (now Brook View House), Jarvis Brook, Rotherfield
- Sophia Jex-Blake (1840–1912), one of the first women doctors, lived in Mark Cross: she is buried in Rotherfield graveyard
- John O. Lyle, Chairman of Tate and Lyle
- Anton Zwemmer (1892–1979), Dutch-born British bookseller, book distributor, art dealer, publisher and collector, lived here in the late 1970s
- Innes Hope Pearse (1889–1978) and her husband George Scott Williamson of the Peckham Experiment, who lived at the Argos Hill windmill
- Lisa Marie Presley (1968–2023), musician and singer, the only child of Elvis Presley
