= Windmill fantail =

Part of a windmill

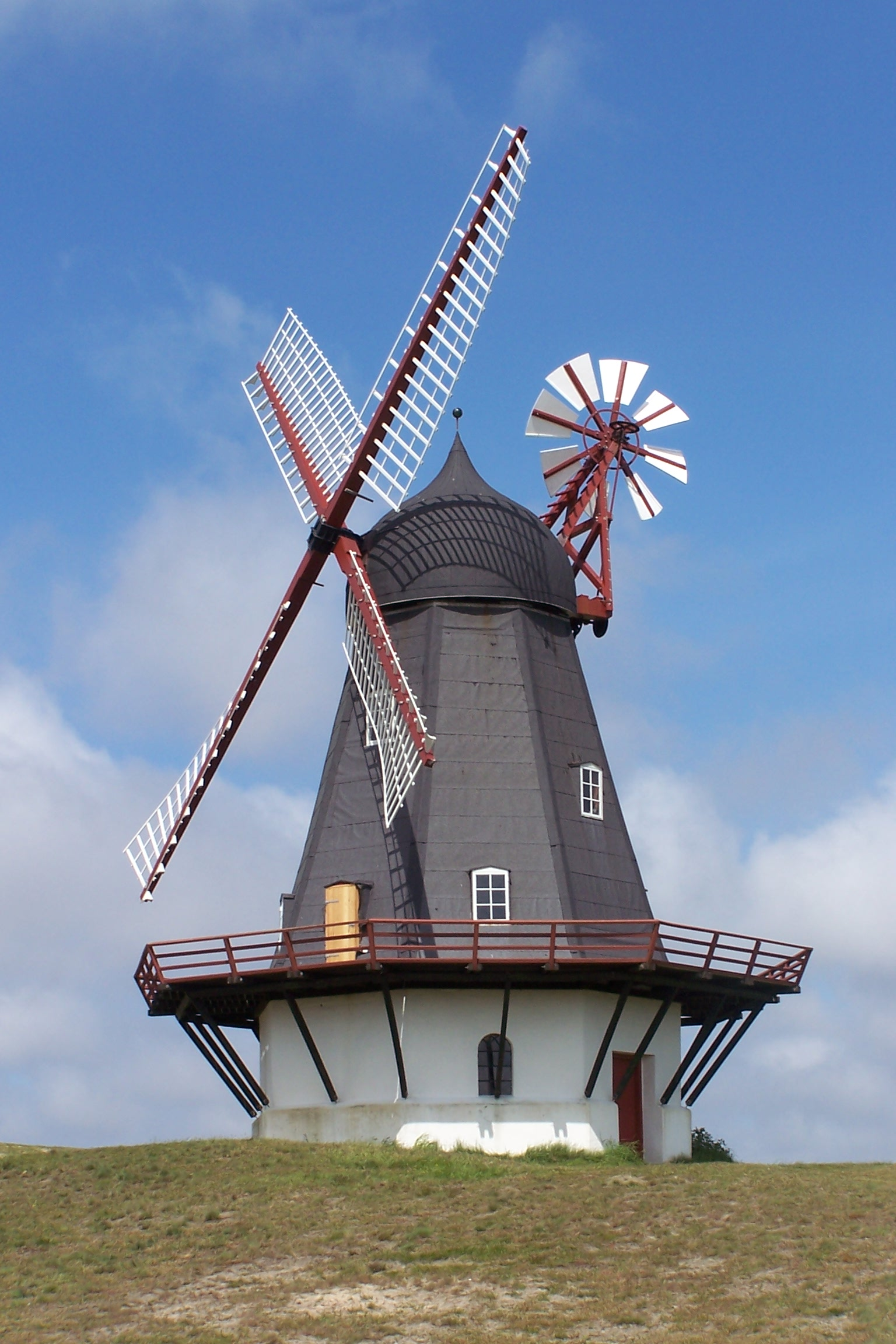
Danish Smock mill from 1895 at Sønderho, Fanø, with fantail

A fantail is a small windmill mounted at right angles to the sails, at the rear of the windmill, and which turns the cap automatically to bring it into the wind. The fantail was patented in 1745 by Edmund Lee, a blacksmith working at Brockmill Forge near Wigan, England, and was perfected on mills around Leeds and Hull towards the end of the 18th century. Fantails are found on all types of traditional windmills and are especially useful where changes in wind direction are frequent. They are more common in England, Denmark and Germany than in other parts of Europe, and are little-known on windmills elsewhere except where English millwrighting traditions were in evidence.

The rotating fantail turns the cap of the windmill via a system of gearing to a toothed rack around the top of the mill tower, or to wheels running on the track in the case of a post mill. It does so until the fantail sails are oriented parallel to the wind, whereby the wind can no longer move them. When the fantail is oriented parallel to the wind, the main sails are in the optimal perpendicular orientation and produce maximum power.
