= Hassocks =

Village and parish in West Sussex, England

Coordinates: 50°55′24″N 0°09′03″W

- Village and civil parish
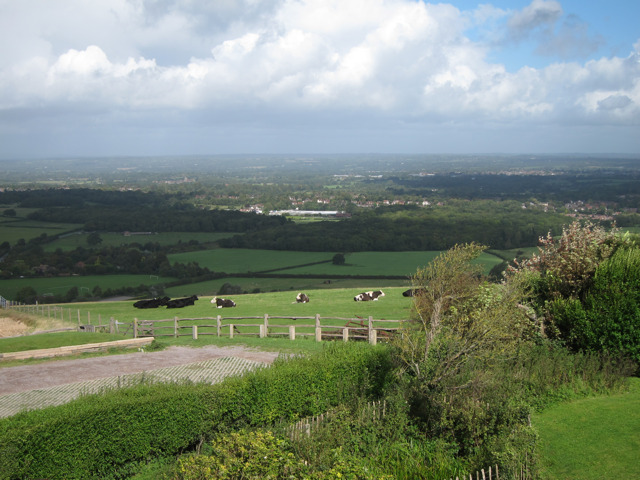
- Hassocks viewed from the South Downs

- Location within West Sussex
- Area: 10.88 km^{2} (4.20 sq mi)
- Population: 7,667 2011 Census
  - Density: 627/km^{2} (1,620/sq mi)
- OS grid reference: TQ299154
  - London: 40 miles (64 km) N
- Civil parish: Hassocks
- District: Mid Sussex
- Shire county: West Sussex
- Region: South East
- Country: England
- Sovereign state: United Kingdom
- Post town: HASSOCKS
- Postcode district: BN6
- Dialling code: 01273
- Police: Sussex
- Fire: West Sussex
- Ambulance: South East Coast
- UK Parliament: Mid Sussex
- Website: http://www.hassockspc.net/

Hassocks is a village and civil parish in the Mid Sussex District of West Sussex, England. Its name is believed to derive from the tufts of grass found in the surrounding fields.

Located approximately 7 miles (11 km) north of Brighton, with a population of 8,319, the area now occupied by Hassocks was just a collection of small houses and a coaching house until the 19th century, when work started on the London to Brighton railway.

Until 2000 the site fell in two parishes, Clayton and Keymer; Hassocks was only the name of the postal district. It is said that with the advent of the railway in 1841 the two parish councils were given the opportunity of naming the new station but could not agree, and eventually the London, Brighton & South Coast Railway chose the station name 'Hassocks Gate'.

== History ==
=== Prehistory up to 19th century ===
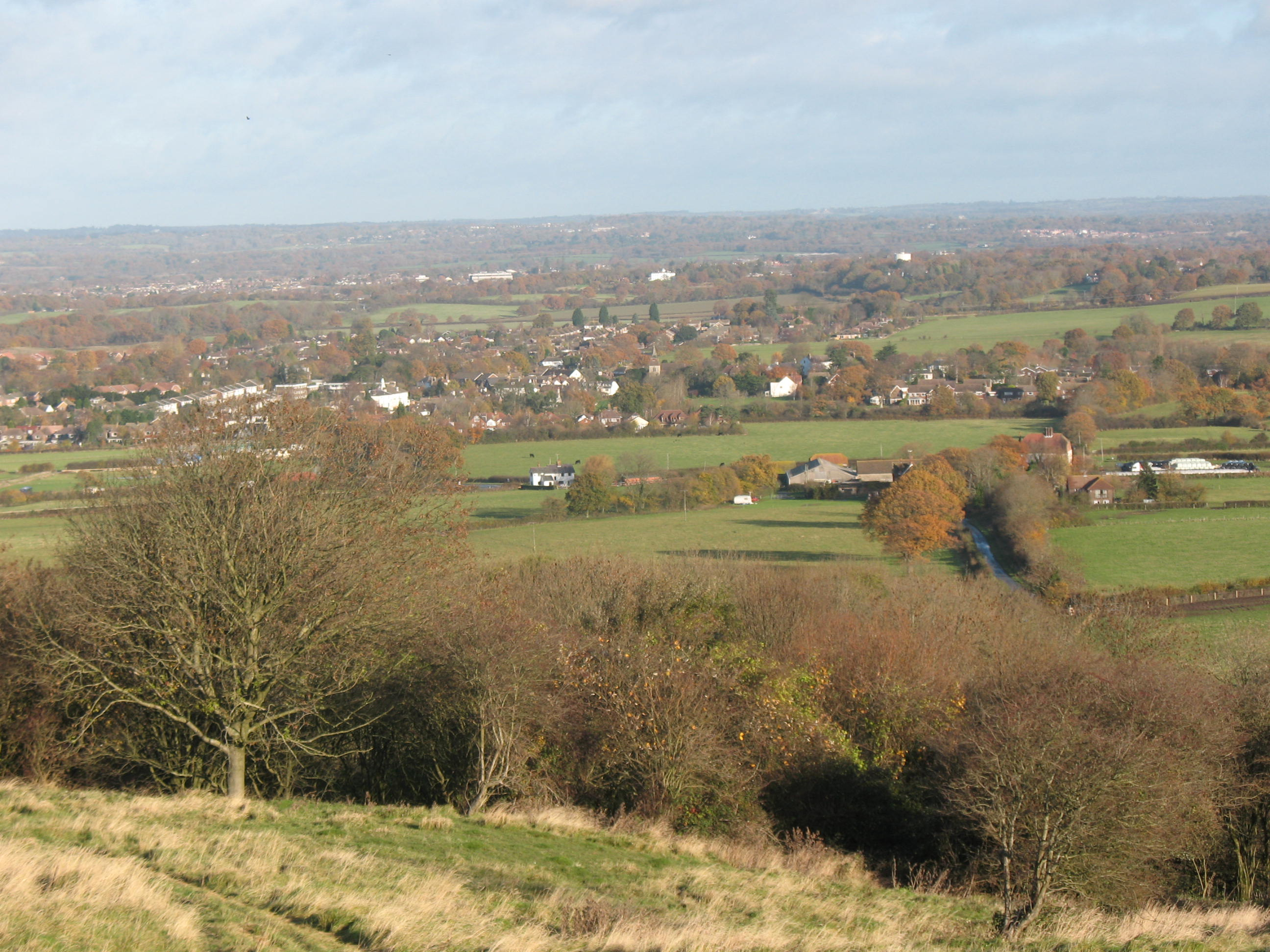
Hassocks viewed from the South Downs

The South Downs, among which the village lies, were settled during the Stone Age, c.20,000BC with an incursion of people and livestock from Europe (to which what is now Great Britain was still connected by land).

A good example of an Iron Age fort is to be found on the top of the nearby Wolstonbury Hill on the South Downs.

A Roman cemetery was found by Stonepound Crossroads. Modern Hassocks is thought to have stood at a Roman crossroads on the London to Brighton Way between Londinium Augusta (modern London) to Novus Portus (possibly modern Portslade) (running north–south) and the Greensand Way Roman road from modern Hardham to a north–south road at Barford Mills north of Lewes and possibly further to Pevensey. Both roads had the dual purposes of servicing the iron industry in the Weald and connecting the prosperous farmlands of the coastal plain and lower Downs with London.

After the Norman conquest much of the area was owned by the manor of Hurstpierpoint and was part of St John's Common. The Keymer part of the Common was enclosed in 1828 and the Clayton portion shortly after in 1855. In this period there was a great expansion of brick fields and potteries making use of the greensand of the area.

=== Modern history ===
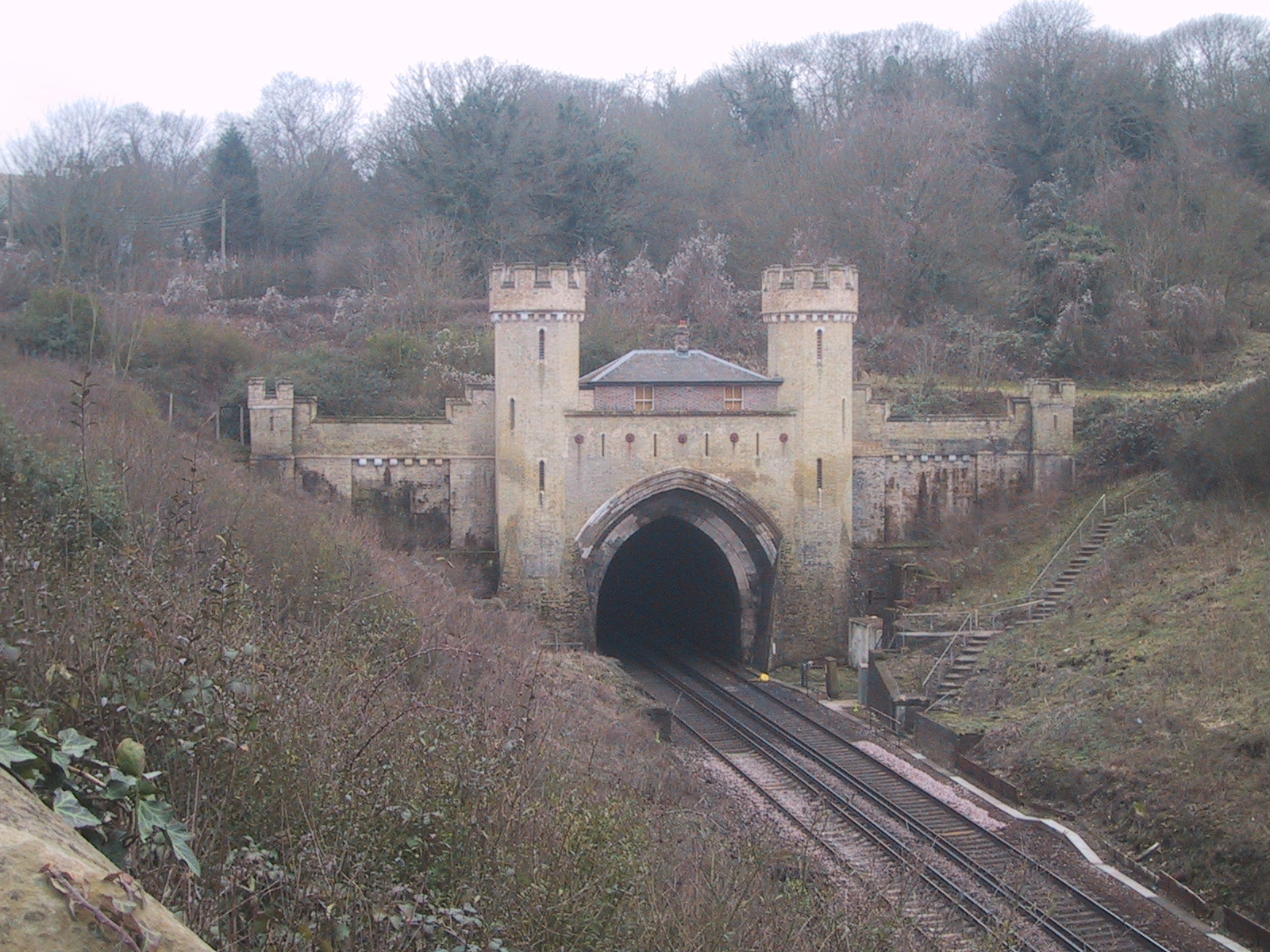
Clayton Tunnel to the south of Hassocks, takes the main London to Brighton railway line under the South Downs

The opening on 21 September 1841 of Hassocks Gate station, named after the nearby toll gate on the turnpike road to Brighton but now known simply as Hassocks, on the London and Brighton Railway was the spur to building the modern village. South of the village the railway passes beneath the chalk escarpment of the South Downs through Clayton Tunnel, which at 6,777 feet (2,066 m) is the longest of the five tunnels on the railway. The north entrance of the tunnel is distinguished by a castellated portal with a dwelling house between the two towers. The latter might have been built for the use of the man who had to look after the gas lighting in the tunnel (for several years after opening the interior of the tunnel was whitewashed and lit by gas lamps, presumably to allay the fears of early railway travellers). In 1861 a collision between two trains within the tunnel killed 23 people and injured 176 others.

In the 1930s the Grand Avenue residential area, along with several other roads, was developed by George Ferguson on the site of former orchards and the Orchard Pleasure Gardens. A special feature of the Hassocks Homes development ordered by Mr Ferguson was the planting of flowering cherry trees along the main roads.

1939 saw the beginning of World War II, and the closure of the cinema in September of that year for the duration (it was still going in the 1950s). Evacuations then began from London bringing an additional 1,250 to the population.

== Neighbourhood plan ==
The Parish Council finished producing the Hassocks Neighbourhood Plan and submitted it to Mid Sussex District Council (MSDC) in June 2016. Neighbourhood Planning Regulations stipulate that once a Draft Plan has been submitted to, and accepted by, the Local Planning Authority, control of the Plan must pass to them. MSDC have now stopped work on the Hassocks Neighbourhood Plan whilst it waits for a decision on the number of homes required for the whole of Mid Sussex District. In 2019 a Revised Neighbourhood Plan was submitted to Mid Sussex District Council, this was subsequently accepted by Mid Sussex District Council and they carried out a public consultation on the Plan in summer 2019. In March 2020 there was a referendum held on the new plan and this was supported by 94% of those that voted.

== Notable buildings and areas ==
Notable areas around Hassocks

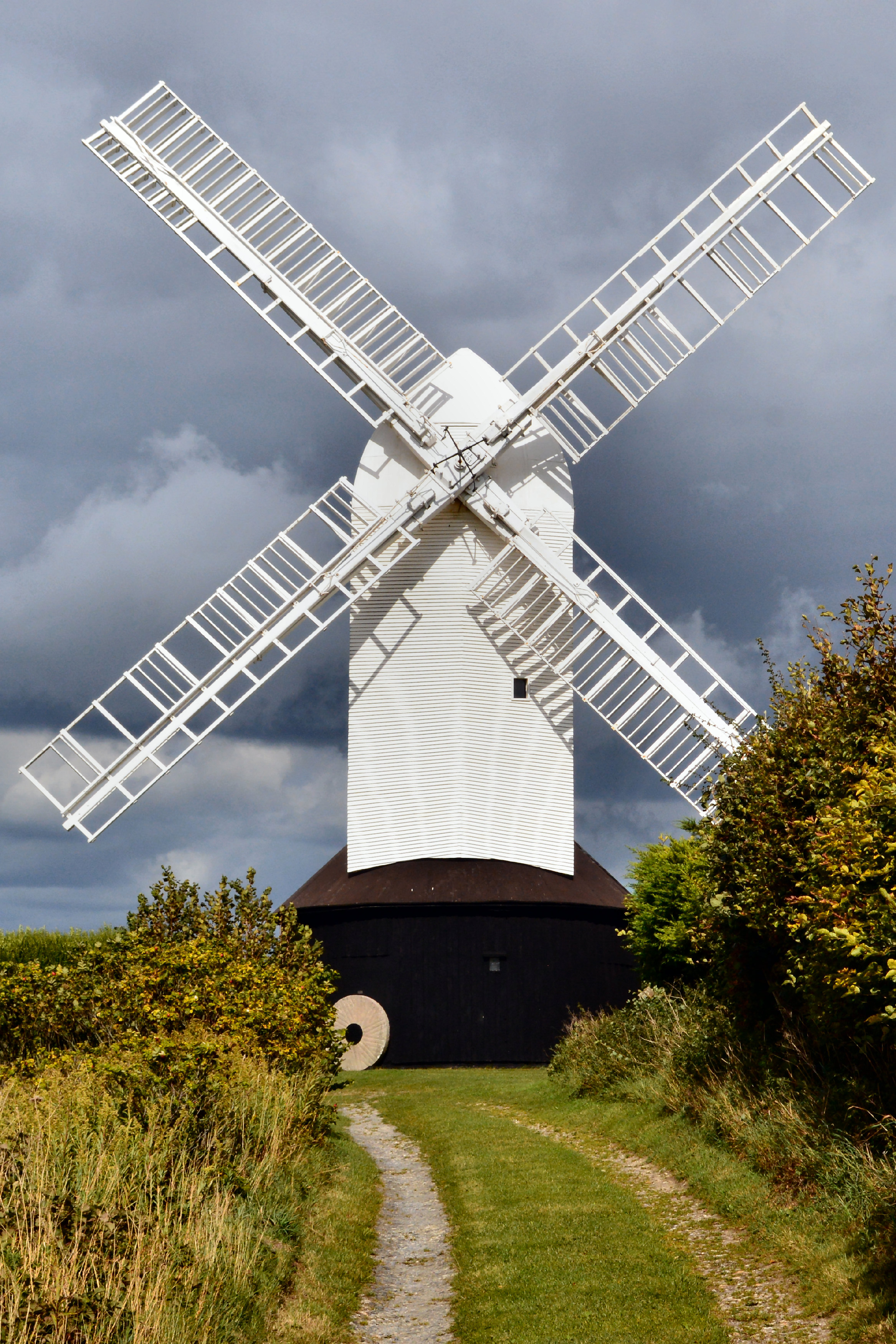
Jill, Clayton Windmills

Hassocks itself has a town centre and a well-used community centre called Adastra Hall which is used for a wide range of community and private events.

The former council buildings, which housed the road maintenance department on London Road, have been demolished and have become a number of homes, whilst the land given to the people of Hassocks (via East Sussex County Council) by a benefactor, previously used by a children's charity, was built upon in 2014/15, the charity having claimed ownership.

Two miles west of Hassocks in the adjoining village of Hurstpierpoint lies Danny House, an Elizabethan manor where David Lloyd George came to draw up terms for the armistice at the end of World War I.

On the downs above Hassocks there are two windmills, named Clayton Windmills but known locally as "Jack and Jill". Jack is a tower mill and was built in 1866. Jill, a post mill, was built in Dyke Road in Brighton in 1821 and was later moved to Clayton in 1852 by a team of oxen. The working life of the mills ended in about 1906, and Jack is now in private ownership; Jill was restored in 1986 and is open to the public. To the North East of the village can be found Oldland Mill.

=== Listed buildings ===
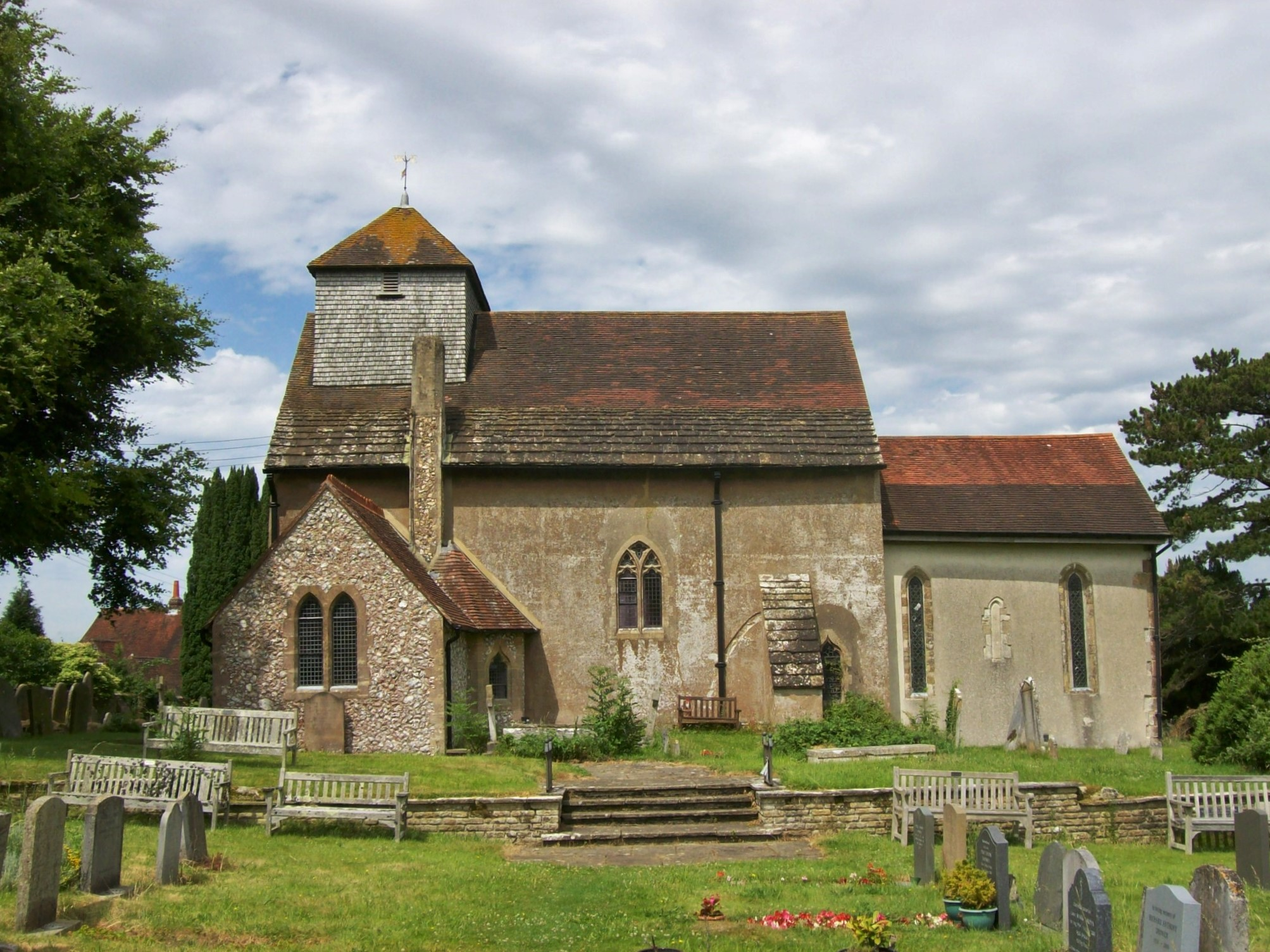
St John, Clayton, Sussex

Hassocks civil parish contains 27 listed buildings. Of these, one is Grade I, three are Grade II* and the remaining 23 buildings are Grade II.

Grade I listed buildings:

- The Parish Church of St John the Baptist, Clayton, an Anglo-Saxon church, noted for its 12th century wall paintings (List Entry Number 1286147).

Grade II* listed buildings:

- Ockley Manor (List Entry Number 1285397), an early 18th century house.
- Clayton Priory (List Entry Number 1354811), a Regency country house built about 1820. The architect was possibly John Rebecca of Worthing.
- Clayton Windmills and the Millhouse Attached (List Entry Number 1354812), better known as 'Jack and Jill' windmills.

=== Scheduled monuments ===
The parish contains one scheduled monument:

- Round barrows West of Ditchling Beacon (List Entry Number 1005830), four bowl barrows, forming part of a round barrow cemetery. The barrows have been levelled by ploughing but survive as buried remains.

=== Sites of Special Scientific Interest ===
There is a Site of Special Scientific Interest within the parish. Clayton to Offham Escarpment, which stretches from Hassocks in the west, passing through many parishes including Ditchling, to Lewes in the East. This site is of biological importance due to its rare chalk grassland habitat along with its woodland and scrub.

=== Woods ===
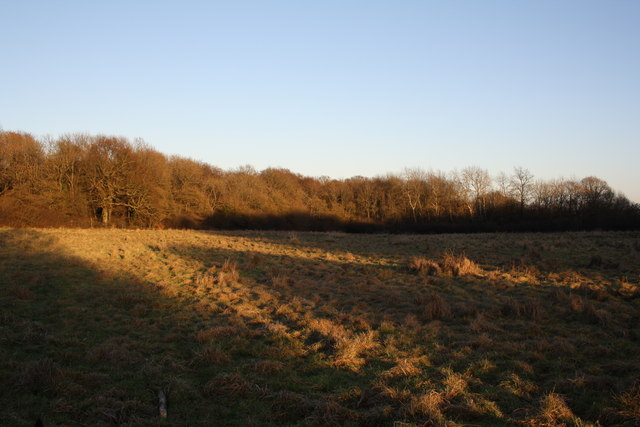
Field between Butcher's Wood and Lagwood

There are a number of ancient woods to the north of the Clayton Tunnel and south of Hassocks village. They sit on Gault Clay beds and are divided by the Brighton Railway Line and the A273 Burgess Hill Road.

==== Butcher's Wood ====
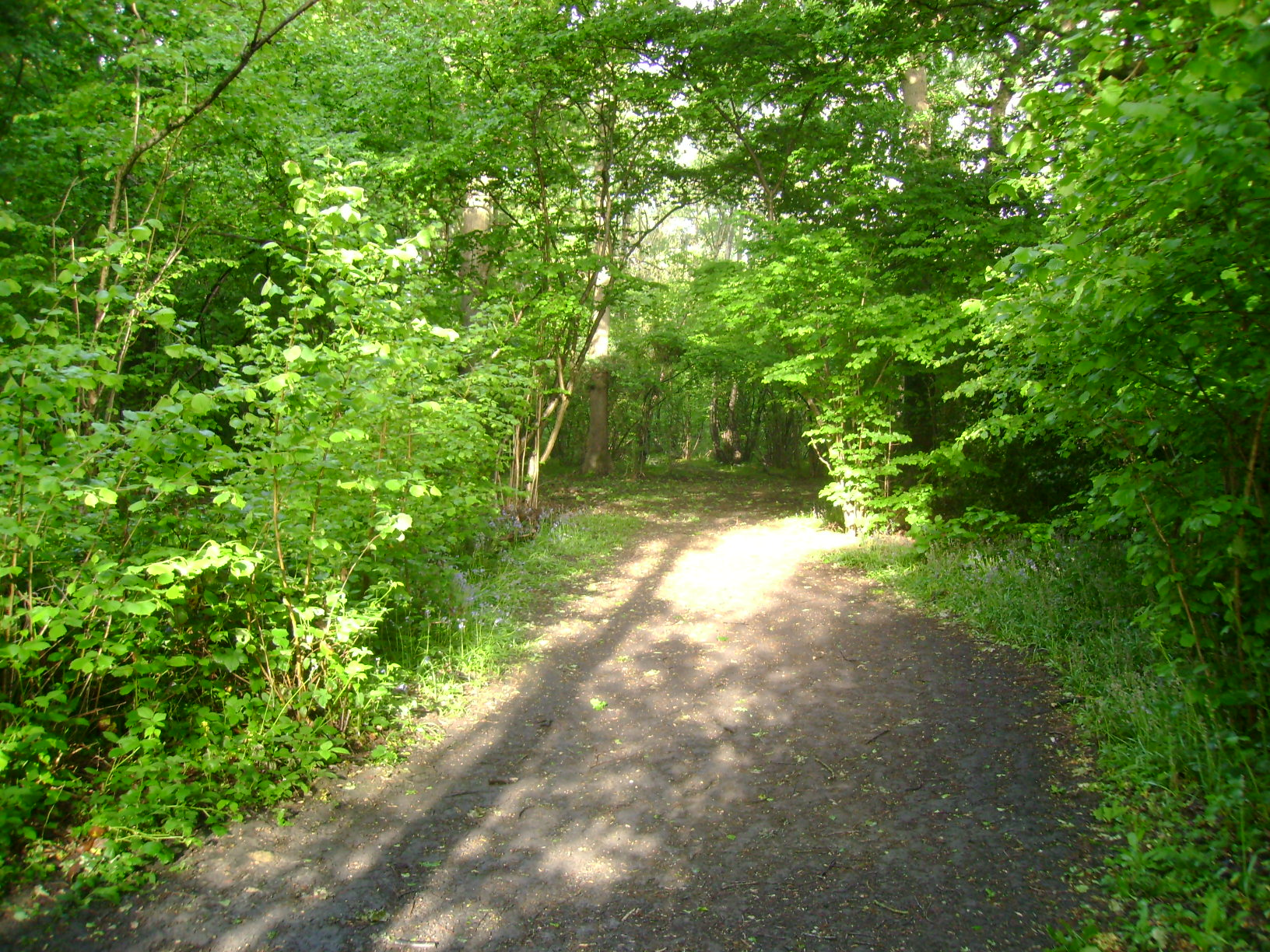
Butcher's Wood

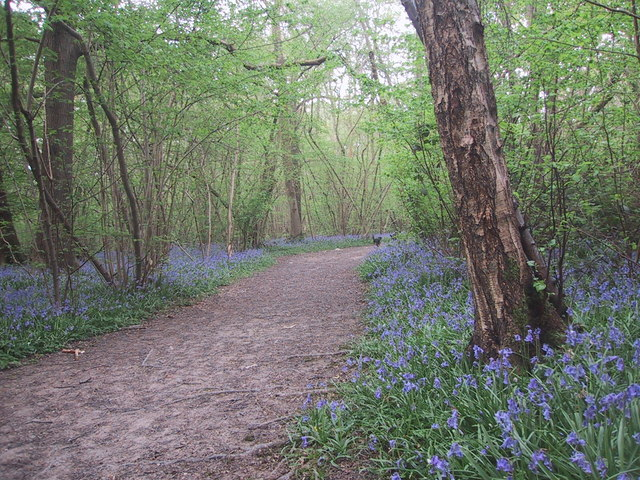
Butcher's Wood in Spring

To the south of Hassocks stations is a small 7.12 hectares (17.6 acres) ancient woodland known as Butcher's Wood (TQ 303 149). The wood is mainly oak and hazel, but there is a small hornbeam grove at the south end. The ground flora is in part wood anemome and in part bluebell. It was acquired by the Woodland Trust in 1988 and is the only one of the Gault woods in quasi-public ownership. There is a northern section that was shaved off for house-building and its western side separated by the railway line. There is re-coppicing work, which help the many song birds that thrive here. Treecreepers and nuthatches benefit too from the added structural complexity.

==== Lag Wood ====
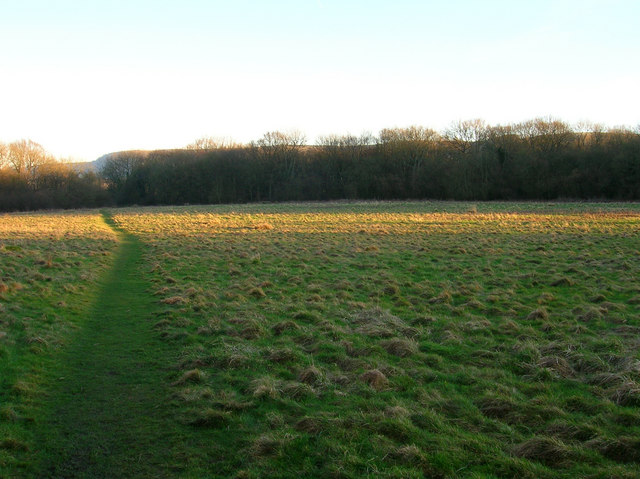
Lag Wood

Lag Wood (TQ 302 146) is a wet wood. The Saxon word 'lag' implies brook meadow. The most biodiverse area is by the brook on the southern boundary, where hornbeam is codominant with hazel and ash. There is wood sorrel and meadowsweet, blackcurrant and spindle, and little early dog violet, kingcups and ladies smock. The brook supports giant cranefly. On the eastern side of the railway, along the footpath to Clayton Church, there is pepper saxifrage, nettle-leaved bellflower, St John's wort, wild marjoram and basil.

==== Bonny's Wood ====
Bonny's Wood (TQ 299 147) is on the other side of the railway track, west of Lag Wood. It is home to many ancient woodland native species. It is mainly an oak and hazel woodland but there is also field maple, birch and ash coppice together with native woody shrubs including hawthorn, wild crab apple, holly and honeysuckle. Its floor is carpeted with wood anemone and bluebells. A plan has been drawn up with the Forestry Commission which aims to use traditional methods to manage the woodland.

==== Ockenden Wood ====
Ockenden Wood (TQ 297 148) is east of Bonny's Wood and has quite dense young coppice growth. Like the other woods on the Gault clay, its floor is a blanket of bluebells and anemones under hazel and a few maiden oaks. It is still coppiced which is important for the wildlife, but it has the unenviable task of buffering the other woods from the worst of the noise of the A23.

=== Streams ===
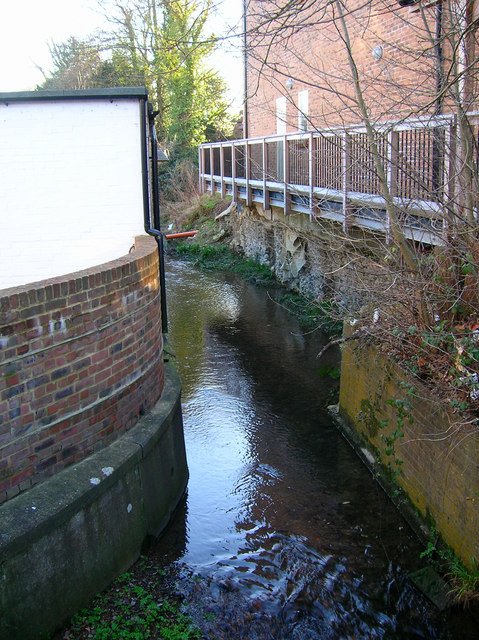
Herrings Stream

Hassocks is crossed by several chalk streams, which run into Eastern the River Adur. Some of the streams are bosky and of high value for biodiversity. A number of watermills used to use the streams, including three on the Heron Stream, at least two of which, Cobb's Mill and Hammond's Mill, were operational until recently. One mill leat still runs clear and swift. The streams support much wildlife including European bullhead and minnow, tiny orb shell mussels, freshwater shrimp and three-spined stickleback.

Under Act 23 of 1807 many streams of the Adur were canalised and the surrounding brook lands drained. The upper reaches of the rivers beyond the navigations did not escape radical re-engineering either, partly for mill leats and impoundments, and partly for land drainage. Most of the streams of the Eastern Adur have been much straightened, but stretches of low energy meanders still remain.

==== Millbrook Shaw Stream ====
Millbrook Shaw Stream runs from Keymer Down and along Underhill Lane. The chalk stream rises at Whitelands Reservoir and provides a turquoise pool beside a house there. From there, Millbrook Shaw stream (TQ 314 141) it bubbles fast with tumbling water over a gravel bed. Along this part of its banks are plants such as golden saxifrage, wild garlic, wood anemones and bluebell. Millbrook Shaw and the Clayton Stream meet at the southern end of Hassocks village and become the Herrings Stream.

==== Clayton Stream ====
The Clayton Stream runs down behind Spring Lane (TQ 303 141), south of New Road it makes a clear pond, once a sheepwash. North of the road it winds through yellow flag and hemlock water dropwort. It runs the through the south east corner of Lag Wood, alongside the eastern boundary of Butcher's Wood and meets the Millbrook Shaw Stream in Hassocks village.

==== Herrings Stream ====
The Herrings stream starts where the Millbrook Shaw and Clayton Stream meet and the continues through the village, bright and clean, but is almost unnoticeable. It goes just east of Hassocks Station, and as the Keymer Road kinks to the right after the old school (TQ 307 155) it passes under the road at the Roman Road's ancient fording point, which used to be known as Spitalford.

=== Friars Oak ===
On the north-western edge of the village, on the London Road, is the Friars Oak, formerly a coaching inn. There used to open meadows known as Friars Oak Fields adjoining it. They were a group of three small wealden meadows divided by ancient hedgerows from the time they were still a part of St John's Common. The meadows were in their natural state with unimproved soil and hence contained archaic meadow plants. It is being developed for housing as part of the Neighbourhood Plan now.

=== Clayton Wood Natural Burial Ground ===
Clayton Wood Natural Burial Ground was opened in 2008. It is a 13 acre meadow and provide for natural burials where a tree is planted over the grave. Eventually the trees will create a woodland which will fall within the boundaries of the new South Downs National Park. It already supports a number of rare species including soprano pipistrelle bats and great crested newts. Bonny's Wood marks the northern limit of the burial area.

=== South Downs ===
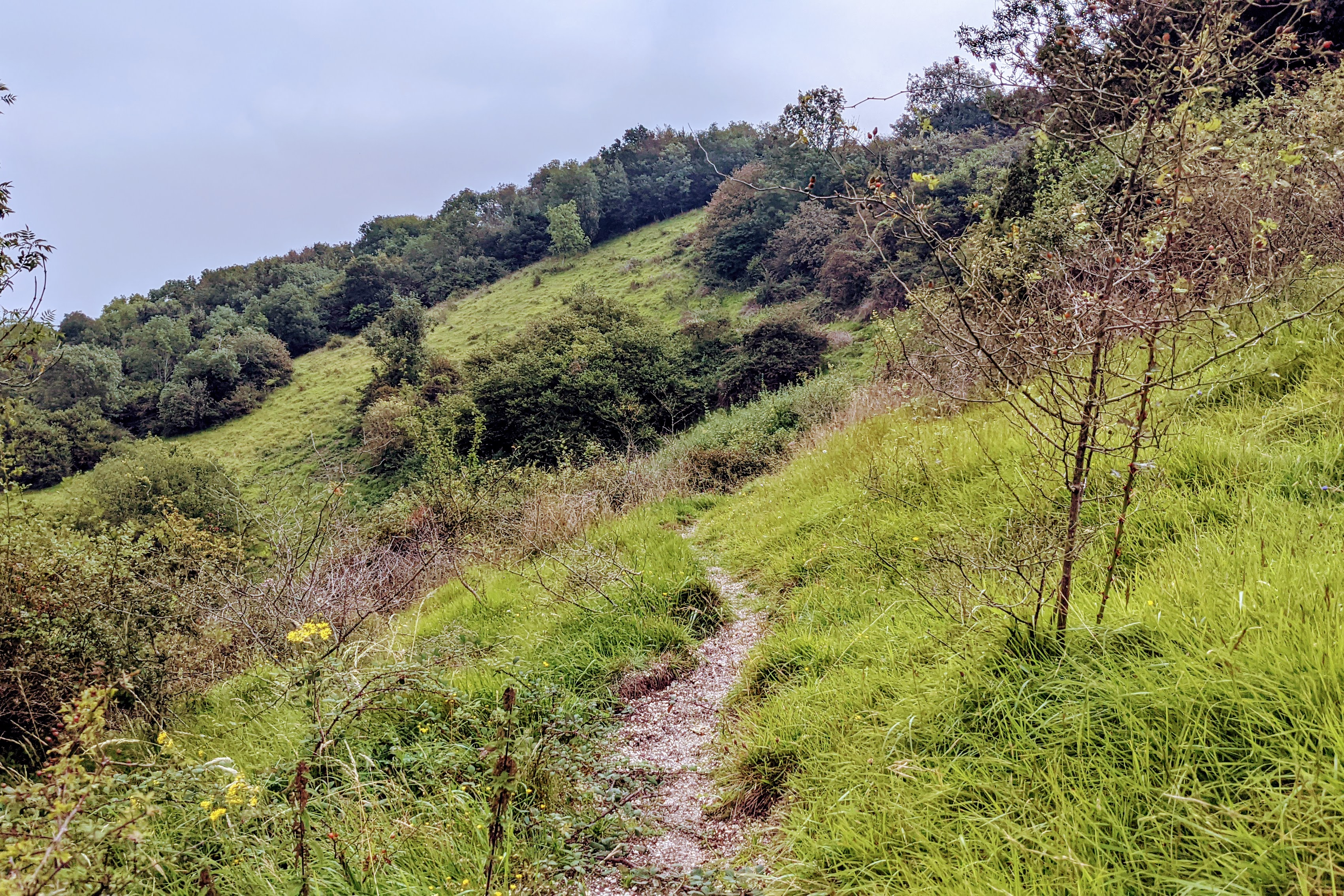
Clayton Down, looking east towards Clayton Holt and beyond Ditching Beacon

While the majority of the parish is in the Sussex Weald, to the south of the parish, are the South Downs. This area is particularly rich in biodiversity and is the western boundary of the Clayton to Offham Escarpment which is a Site of Special Scientific Interest.

==== Clayton Down ====
Clayton Down (TQ 305 136) has been described by David Bangs, a Sussex field naturalist, as "one of nature's self-grown orchards". Few sites on the South Downs can match its botanical richness. There are blackberries, crab apple, sloe berries, and pink and orange spindle berries. There may be as many at least twenty-five scrub species, eighteen of which have fleshy and colourful fruits and eleven of which of are members of the rose family. On the roses and dogwood Robin's pincushion has been created by the Diplolepis rosae gall wasp.

==== Clayton Holt ====
Clayton Holt (TQ 310 134) is a downland wood that is thought to have stood for ten thousand years or more with at least thirteen ancient woodland indicator species, including two big hybrid large-leaved/small-leaved limes growing at the base of slope. Up until 1838 there was a large-leaved lime, a signal that the woodland on this site has been here for millennia. It is also one of the best places on the Downs to see veteran beeches. The lesser butterfly orchid, which is much rarer than its ‘greater’ cousin, has also been found here.

== Railway station ==
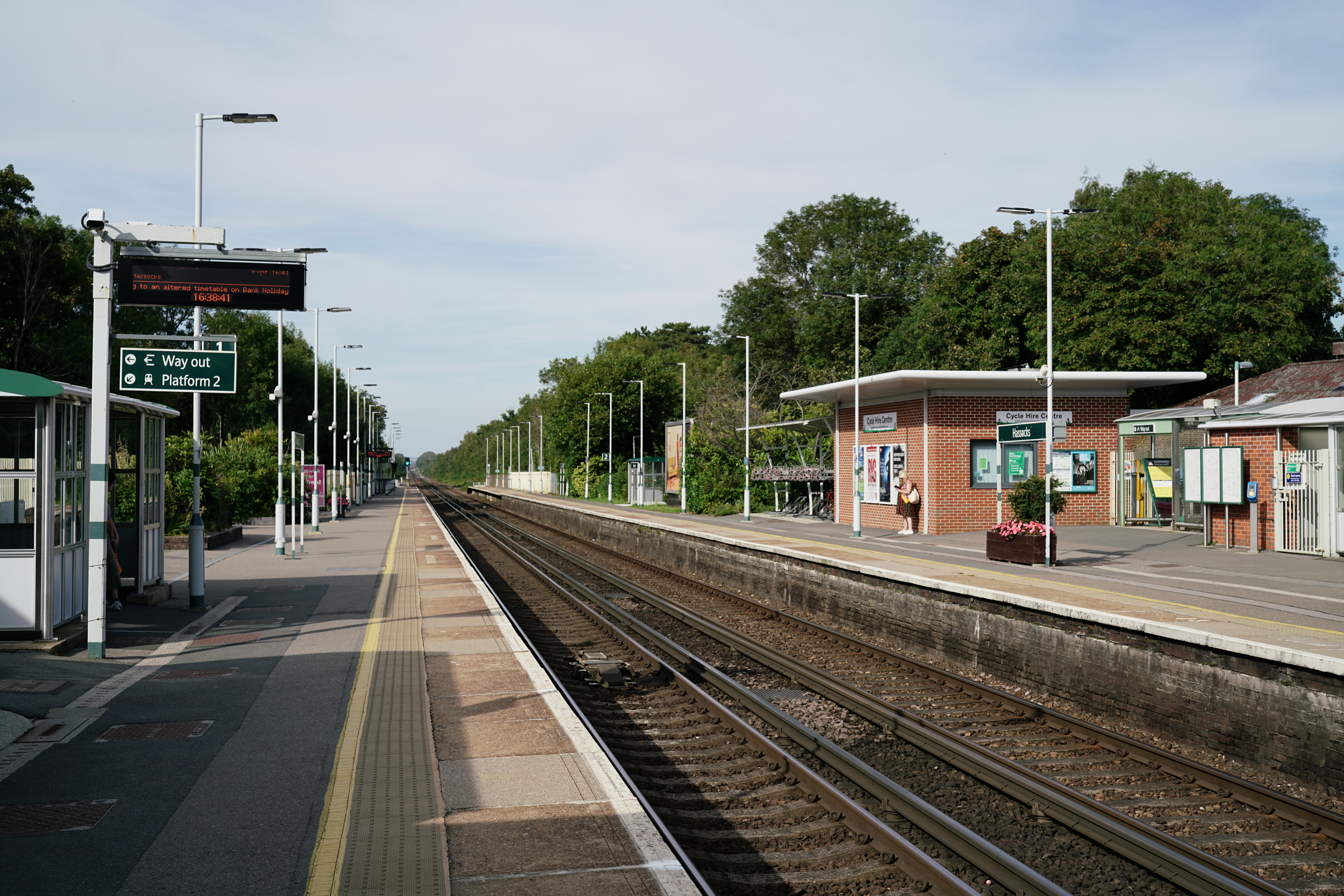
Hassocks railway station

Hassocks railway station serves the village. Thameslink and Southern provide regular train services to Brighton, London Victoria, Bedford and Cambridge. The station was rebuilt and redeveloped in 2013; the new main station building was opened on 5 July, with the addition of lifts on both platforms completed by December 2013.

== Education ==
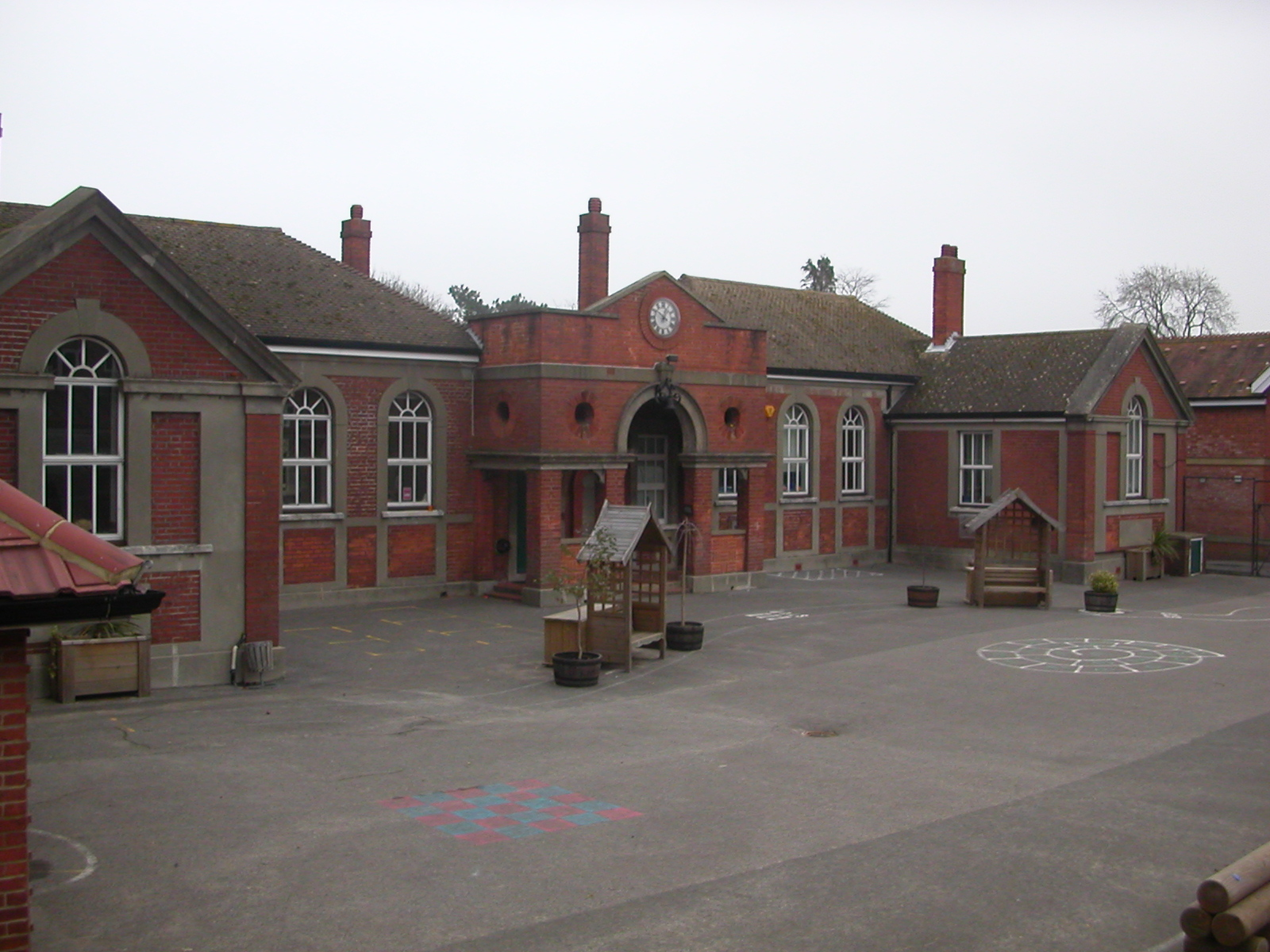
Hassocks Infants School. The inlaid clock above the entrance was purchased and installed in 2000 from money raised through a special "Millennium Fund".

Hassocks Infant School is a maintained infant school for pupils aged 4 to 7 and built in 1877 as a Victorian Board School. It currently caters for around 270 pupils, with three classes in each year group. The school is centrally located in the village. It has been considerably enlarged with a number of additions to the original Victorian building including a large hall and six new classrooms. The previous Headteacher, Jeannie Hughes retired after 13 years and the current Headteacher is Adrian Bates-Holland. The Chair of Governors is Becki Jupp.

Junior education in the village is provided by Windmills Junior School.

Secondary education for the village and surrounding areas is provided by Downlands Community School. Downlands does not have a sixth form and children wishing to do 'A' levels have to travel to a variety of sixth form colleges, including Varndean College, St Paul's Catholic College (Burgess Hill), Brighton Hove & Sussex Sixth Form College and Hurstpierpoint College. Downlands Community School has a sports hall and AstroTurf football pitch funded by the late Chelsea F.C. vice-chairman Matthew Harding's wife.

== Sport ==
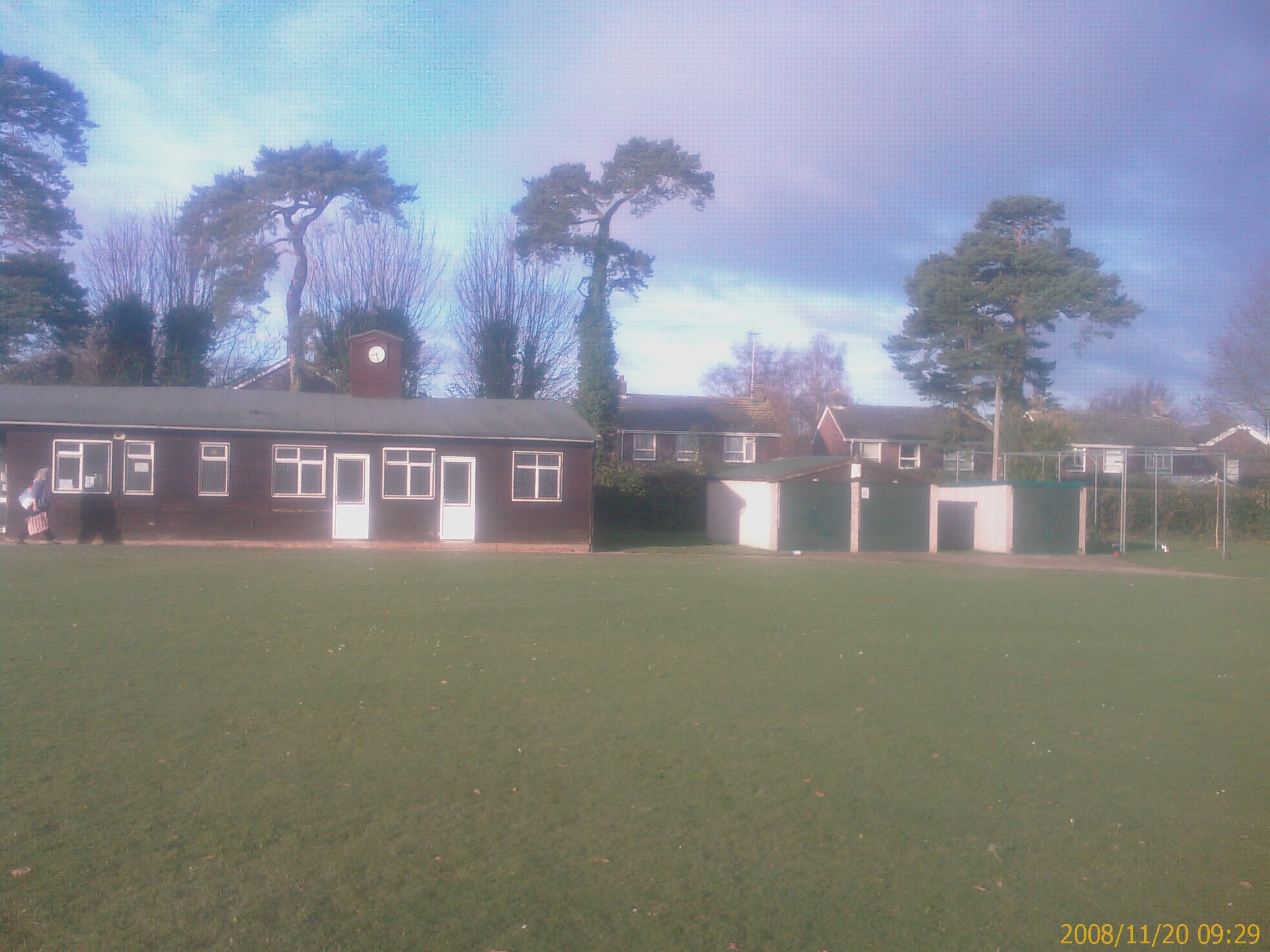
Adastra Park, the now demolished Cricket Pavilion.

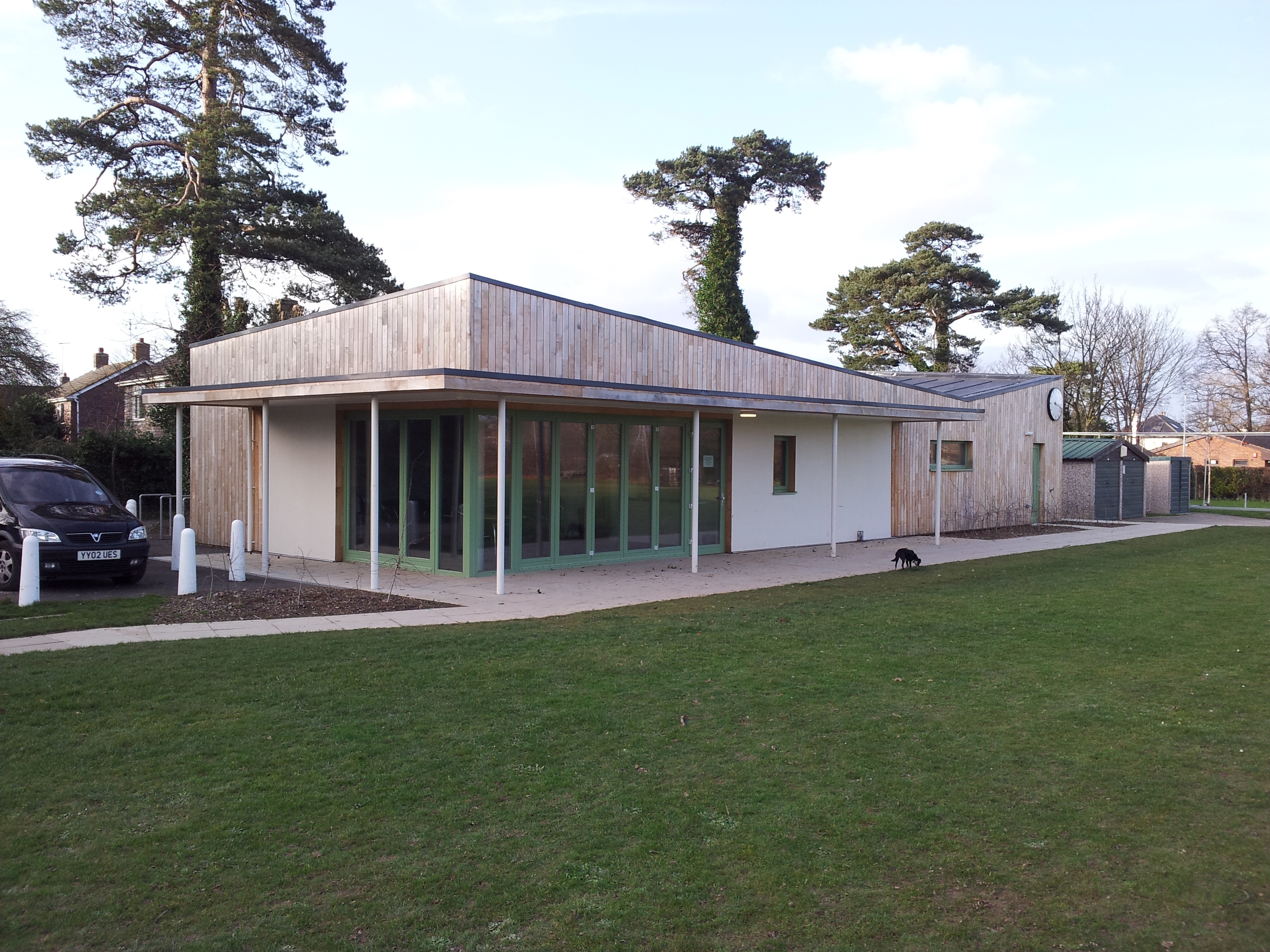
New community pavilion

In late 2010 the 30-year-old sports pavilion was demolished to make way for a new building utilising the latest air source heat pump technologies.

There are several specific football pitches in Adastra Park where both junior and senior games are played and the park is also the home to Keymer & Hassocks Cricket Club the primary users of the sports pavilion. Adastra Park also has a skate park and two playgrounds suitable for children of all ages. A 5 a-side football competition often takes place in August in the park, in which teams from the whole of the south east compete in a day long tournament.

Hassocks F.C. play at the nearby Beacon Ground with the first team playing in SCFL Div One. In addition there are three municipal tennis courts in Adastra Park and the 'Weald Tennis and Squash Club' on South Bank is a significant club in the village.

Hassocks Sports Centre is situated within the grounds of Downlands Community School and is operated by Freedom Leisure. Facilities include an indoor sports hall, a multi-purpose dance studio, a full sized 4g astro turf football pitch and a gym.

== Twin towns ==
Hassocks's twin towns are:

- Montmirail – France.
- Wald-Michelbach – Germany.

== Notable people ==
- Austen Albu (1903–1994), former British Labour Member of Parliament for Edmonton (UK Parliament constituency), former Minister of State for Economic Affairs, lived in The Crescent, Keymer, with his wife, social psychologist Marie Jahoda (1907–2001).
- Martin Dugard, motorcycle racer
- Patrick Hamilton (1904–1962), the playwright and novelist, was born in Hassocks on 17 March 1904.
- Jonathan Pearce the football commentator, known for his work on Match of the Day and Robot Wars, lives in Hassocks.
- William Plomer (1903–1973), poet, novelist, biographer etc. died at 43, Adastra Avenue, Hassocks in 1973.
