= Downlands =

Downlands may refer to:

- Downland, an area of open chalk hills, especially in southern England
- Downlands College, a school in Queensland, Australia
- Downlands Community School in West Sussex, England
