= St Pancras Waterpoint =

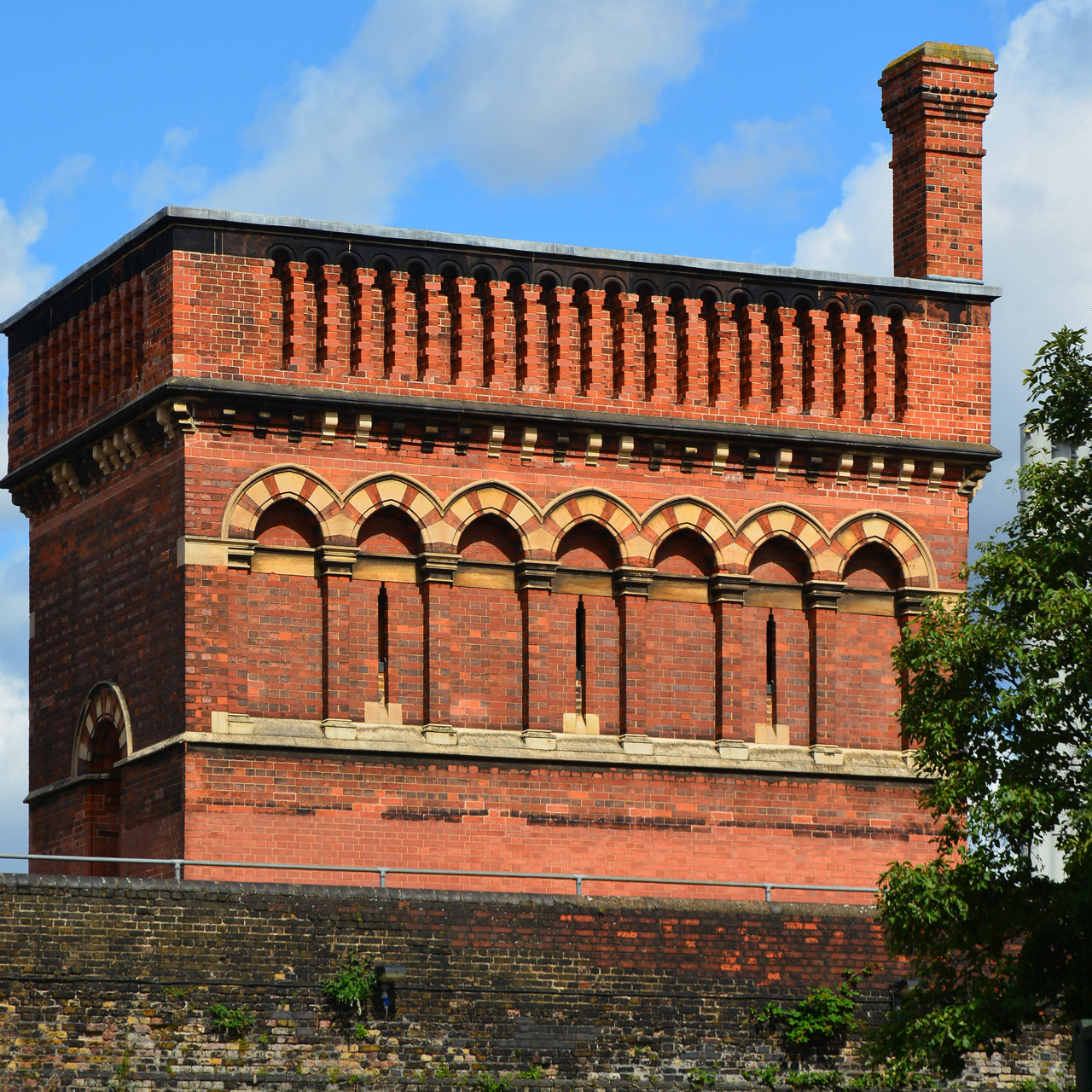
- Photo of Waterpoint Building
- Interactive map of the St Pancras Waterpoint area

General information
- Architectural style: Victorian Gothic
- Location: Camley Street
- Coordinates: 51.535948°N 0.128446°W
- Year built: 1868
- Relocated: 2001
- Renovated: 2001

Design and construction
- Architect: Sir George Gilbert Scott
- Architecture firm: Sir George Gilbert Scott

St Pancras Waterpoint is a water tower in the London Borough of Camden. It is a Grade II listed building. It was originally used to refill steam locomotives at St Pancras station with water. The Victorian Gothic brick structure was built around 1868, and designed by the office of Sir George Gilbert Scott, who was also responsible for the Midland Grand Hotel at Pancras station. The three-story structure measures approximately 9m by 6m, and houses a cast-iron tank on the top floor capable of holding 68 cubic metres of water.

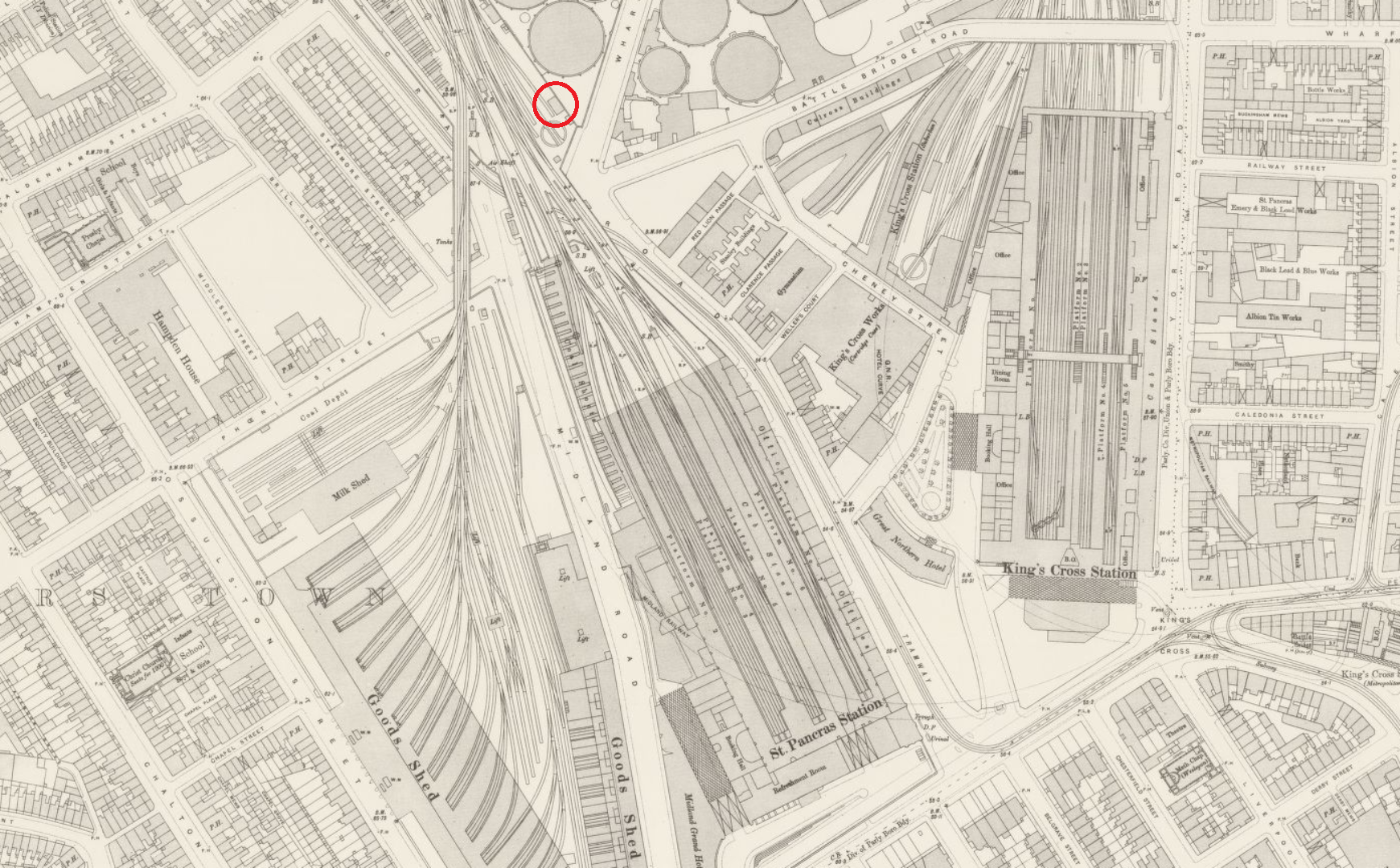
Location of St Pancras Waterpoint on 1893 map

The water point was originally located further south and oriented approximately 100° anticlockwise from its current position. With the enlargement of St Pancras to accommodate International Eurostar services the WaterPoint needed to be moved to make space. In November 2001, following three years of planning, it was relocated a few hundred metres to its current site. The original plan had been to deconstruct and rebuild the Waterpoint, however a survey found that the mortar would not withstand dismantling without causing significant damage to the structure. Furthermore, the lower third of the building had been damaged to the extent that it could not be transported. Consequently, the structure was divided into three sections, with the upper two moved onto a newly reconstructed base. The project cost £915,190 in total.

Owned by the London Historic Buildings Trust, the building and its site are leased to the Canal & River Trust and used by the St Pancras Cruising Club, which also organises open days during the summer.
