= Friars Oak Fields =

Meadows in West Sussex, England

Coordinates: 50.933169°N 0.144654°W

Friars Oak Fields have now been developed, but they were a local landmark on the north-western edge of the village of Hassocks, in the county of West Sussex, England. They were a group of three small wealden meadows in their natural state, divided by ancient hedgerows. The railway and the Herring Stream served to isolate the eastern and western boundaries of Friars Oak Fields, which created a largely undisturbed environment favourable for wildlife. The Friars Oak Inn, an old coaching stop where horses were changed, was immediately adjacent to the Fields, on the western side. The western boundary of the fields was demarcated by the "Herring Stream" and the fields served as a flood plain for the stream. The eastern boundary of the fields was demarcated by a high raised embankment carrying the Brighton Main Line railway. The northern boundary of Friars Oak Fields met agricultural countryside. Access points to Friars Oak Fields were all located at the southern boundary.

in 2019, Developer Rydon Homes and subsequently Taylor Wimpey have since been granted planning permission for 130 residential homes for the land at north of Shepherds Walk, Hassocks with access from London Road and a pedestrian tunnel under the railway line. Taylor Wimpey have built over half of the properties in phases.

A previous application for the same site, with a footbridge instead of a tunnel, was rejected by Mid Sussex District Council in 2018 as it conflicted with a number of policies in the district plan. The developer had appealed against this decision and inquiry was due to be held in September 2018. However, the council’s development control committee decided to grant outline permission by seven votes to four on Thursday, July 25, 2019.

The decision brought an end to a long-running campaign by local residents to save the green space from development.

Footpath 5k has since reopened allowing a more direct route between northern parts of Hassocks under the railway.

== South Downs National Park ==
The village of Hassocks straddles the border of the South Downs National Park and Friars Oak Fields are located just outside that border, but have views of the National Park landmarks of Wolstonbury Hill and Clayton Windmills.

== History ==
Excavations at Friars Oak at the end of the 20th Century revealed remains dating from the Mesolithic through to the Middle Saxon periods, including features from an early Roman settlement. A footpath running north/south across the centre of the western fields follows the line of a Roman road which led ultimately to London. A small triangular area adjacent to the southernmost field is named "Bullpit Field" reflecting its use for bull-baiting in the 18th and 19th centuries.

== Literature ==
The Friars Oak Inn and Friars Oak Fields are used as a setting by Sir Arthur Conan Doyle for his novel "Rodney Stone".
