= Sarah Featherstone =

British architect (born 1966)

- Born: 1966 (age 58–59)
Further information
Occupation	Architect
Awards
- Practice: Featherstone Young
- Buildings: Stonecrop (2019) House, Haslemere (2018); Bay 20 community centre and Dale Youth Amateur Boxing Club (2018); Tŷ Pawb (‘Everyone’s House’) (2018); Jack Windmill (2017); Habitat House (2011–16); Waddington Studios (2014–15); Byam Shaw School of Art (2014); Staff Club at Central Saint Martin's Kings Cross Campus (2013); Dellow Arts and Activity Centre (2012); Ty Hedfan (2010); Sunshine Centre (2007); SERICC (2007); Bayswater penthouse for Harry Handelsman (2007); Orchid House (2006); Fordham White Hair Salon (2002); Drop House (2001); Voss Street House (2002); Baggy House Pool (1998) Blue Note Club for Acid Jazz, previously the Bass Clef, Hoxton, London (1993)

Sarah Featherstone (born 1966 in Barnstaple, Devon) is a British architect.

== Career ==
Her practice, Featherstone Young, is based in London and has designed projects in the housing, community, cultural, education and commercial sectors. She is also a Co-Founder of VeloCity, a strategic growth and placemaking approach centered on a modernized vision of the English village.

Sarah studied architecture at Kingston University London, the Architectural Association School of Architecture and The Bartlett School of Architecture, UCL. Prior to setting up Featherstone Young with co-director Jeremy Young, she was a founding partner of Hudson Featherstone Architects, and Featherstone Waugh with Andrew Waugh (1992–1995).

Sarah teaches at Central St Martins, University of the Arts London (UAL), on the interdisciplinary MA Narrative Environment course, and has been a visiting critic at various UK architecture schools, including the Welsh School of Architecture, Cardiff University.

She was an inaugural member of the CABE National Design Review Panel and has been an External Examiner at a number of universities including UCL, London Metropolitan University and Oxford Brookes University.

She is a Civic Trust Awards judge and RIBA Awards judge and is currently on the Islington and St Albans Design Review panels, and formerly those of Southwark and Camden. Sarah and her work have been widely featured in various media, including Channel 4's Extraordinary Escapes with Sandi Toksvig, Channel 4's George Clarke's Amazing Spaces, Channel 4's Not all Houses are Square, BBC Two's The House That £100k Built, BBC Two's The Culture Show, BBC Radio 4's Woman's Hour, and BBC Radio 3's Night Waves.

== Awards ==
Established in 2002, Featherstone Young has won a number of awards, most recently RIBA Awards for Tŷ Pawb (2021), Stonecrop (2021) and Jack Windmill (2017); AJ Retrofit of the Year Award 2019 for Tŷ Pawb (2020); and the Gold Medal for Architecture of the National Eisteddfod of Wales for Tŷ Pawb (2019). RIBA Awards have also been awarded to homelessness charity Providence Row’s The Dellow Centre in London, SERICC (South Essex Rape and Incest Crisis Centre) and Ty Hedfan, a new house in Wales.

The practice was a finalist in BD Architect of the Year Award (2017) and The Architecture Foundation’s Next Generation Award (2007)and BD Young Architect of the Year Award (2006).

== Education ==
- 1992–1994 Diploma, The Bartlett School of Architecture, UCL
- 1991–1992 Diploma, the Architectural Association School of Architecture
- 1986–1989 BA (Hons) Architecture, Kingston University London

== Significant Buildings ==
- Stonecrop, Rutland, England (2019)
- House, Haslemere, Surrey (2018)
- Bay 20 community centre and Dale Youth Amateur Boxing Club (previously housed in the Grenfell Tower), London (2018)
- Tŷ Pawb (‘Everyone’s House’), Wrexham, Wales (2018)
- Jack Windmill, South Downs National Park (2017)
- Habitat House (2011–16)
- Waddington Studios: studios (Phase 1), house (Phase 2), London (2014–15)
- Byam Shaw School of Art campus redevelopment, London (2014)
- Staff Club at Central Saint Martin's Kings Cross Campus (2013)
- Dellow Arts and Activity Centre, Providence Row, East London (2012)
- Ty Hedfan, Pontfaen, Wales (2010)
- Sunshine Centre, Tilbury Thurrock (2007)
- SERICC (South Essex Rape and Incest Crisis Centre) (2007)
- Bayswater penthouse for Harry Handelsman (2007)
- Orchid House (2006)
- Room Set, Daily Telegraph House and Garden Fair (2004)
- Fordham White Hair Salon, Greek Street, London (2002)
- Drop House, Northaw, Herts (2001)
- Voss Street House (2002)
- Baggy House Pool (1998)
- Blue Note Club for Acid Jazz, previously the Bass Clef, Hoxton, London (1993)

== Practices ==
- Featherstone Young
- Featherstone Associates
- Hudson Featherstone Architects
- Featherstone Waugh

== Honours, decorations, awards and distinctions ==
- RIBA
  - (2021) Tŷ Pawb
  - (2021) Stonecrop
  - (2017) Jack Windmill
  - The Dellow Centre in London for Providence Row
  - SERICC (South Essex Rape and Incest Crisis Centre)
  - Ty Hedfan, a new house in Wales
- (2020) AJ Retrofit of the Year Award 2019 for Tŷ Pawb (2020)
- (2019) Gold Medal for Architecture of the National Eisteddfod of Wales for Tŷ Pawb, Wrexham, Wales
- (2017) Finalist in BD Architect of the Year Award
- (2007) The Architecture Foundation’s Next Generation Award
- (2006) BD Young Architect of the Year Award (2006).

== Teaching and Examining ==
- Central St Martins
- University of the Arts London, MA Narrative Environment
- University College London, former examiner
- London Metropolitan University, former examiner
- Oxford Brookes University, former examiner
