= Seven Days to a Killing =

1973 novel by Clive Egleton

First edition (publ. Hodder and Stoughton)

Seven Days to a Killing is a British spy novel by Clive Egleton, published in 1973. It was adapted to film as The Black Windmill in 1974, with Michael Caine as the lead. It concerns an MI6 officer whose son is kidnapped, and a ransom of $500,000 demanded.
