= Clive Egleton =

British novelist

Clive (Frederick William) Egleton (25 November 1927 – March 2006) was a British author of spy and crime novels. He also wrote under the pseudonyms John Tarrant and Patrick Blake.

== Early life and military career ==
Egleton was born in South Harrow, Middlesex, and was educated at Haberdashers' Aske's Boys' School. In 1945, while still underage, he enlisted in the Royal Armoured Corps in 1945 to train as a tank driver while still underage. He was subsequently commissioned into the South Staffordshire Regiment for whom he served in India, Hong Kong, Germany, Egypt, Cyprus, The Persian Gulf and East Africa (Uganda).

In 1957, he graduated from the Royal Military Academy Sandhurst. Promoted to lieutenant colonel in 1970, he was stationed in Nottingham before retiring from active service in 1975.

== Writing career ==
Egleton began writing in the late 1960s, drawing upon his extensive military and intelligence experience. His debut novel, A Piece of Resistance (1970), was the first in a trilogy set in an alternate-history Britain occupied by Soviet forces. He achieved wider recognition with Seven Days to a Killing (1973), which was adapted into the 1974 film The Black Windmill, directed by Don Siegel and starring Michael Caine. Another notable work, The October Plot (1974), a thriller about an assassination attempt on Martin Bormann, became an international bestseller.

Egleton wrote over fifty novels in his career. Under his own name, he published numerous espionage thrillers, including the long-running Peter Ashton series, which focused on British intelligence operations. As John Tarrant, he wrote three additional espionage novels. Under the name Patrick Blake, he novelized the 1979 film Escape to Athena.

His books were translated into fifteen languages, and he was regarded as one of Britain's leading thriller writers.

== Later life and death ==
In 2005, Egleton was elected to Arreton Parish Council on the Isle of Wight in 2005 . He died in March 2006 in Bembridge, Isle of Wight.

== Bibliography ==
=== Novels (as Clive Egleton) ===
- Seven Days to a Killing [1973]
- The Bormann Brief [1974]
- The October Plot [1974]
- Skirmish [1975]
- State Visit [1976]
- The Mills Bomb [1978]
- Backfire [1979]
- The Winter Touch [1981]
- A Falcon for the Hawks [1982]
- The Russian Enigma [1983]
- A Conflict of Interests [1984]
- Troika [1984]
- A Different Drummer [1985]
- Picture of the Year [1987]
- Gone Missing [1988]
- Death of a Sahib [1989]
- In the Red [1990]
- Last Act [1991]
- A Double Deception [1994]

=== Garnett novels (as Clive Egleton) ===
- A Piece of Resistance [1970] published in US as Never Surrender [2004]
- Last Post for a Partisan [1971] published in US as The Sleeper [1971]
- The Judas Mandate [1972] published in US as The Last Refuge [2006]

=== Peter Ashton novels (as Clive Egleton) ===
- Hostile Intent [1993]
- A Killing in Moscow [1994]
- Death Throes [1995]
- Warning Shot [1996]
- A Lethal Involvement [1996]
- Blood Money [1997]
- Dead Reckoning [1999]
- The Honey Trap [2000]
- One Man Running [2001]
- Cry Havoc [2003]
- Assassination Day [2004]
- The Renegades [2005]

=== Novels (writing as Patrick Blake) ===
- Escape to Athena [1979]
- Double Griffin [1981] aka The Skorzeny Project [1981]

=== Novels (writing as John Tarrant) ===
- A Spy's Ransom-2003
- The Rommel Plot [1977]
- The Clauberg Trigger [1978]
- China Gold [1982] aka Operation Sovereign [1998]

== Radio adaptations ==
Several of his works written under the name John Tarrant were adapted into German-language radio crime dramas between 1966 and 1980, including:

- Harte Männer ("Tough Men", 1966, Hessischer Rundfunk)
- Die friedliche Insel ("The Peaceful Island", 1968, Bayerischer Rundfunk)
- Danse Macabre ("Dance of Death", 1981, Süddeutscher Rundfunk)
