= The Black Windmill =

1974 film by Don Siegel

- Original film poster
- Directed by: Don Siegel
- Written by: Leigh Vance
- Based on: Seven Days to a Killing (1973 novel) by Clive Egleton
- Produced by: Don Siegel
- Starring: Michael Caine; Donald Pleasence; Delphine Seyrig; Clive Revill; Janet Suzman; John Vernon; Joss Ackland
- Cinematography: Ousama Rawi
- Edited by: Antony Gibbs
- Music by: Roy Budd
- Production company: Zanuck/Brown Company
- Distributed by: Universal Pictures (U.S.); Cinema International Corporation (worldwide)
- Release dates: May 16, 1974 (New York); July 18, 1974 (London)
- Running time: 106 minutes
- Country: United Kingdom; United States
- Language: English
- Budget: $1.5 million

The Black Windmill is a 1974 spy thriller film directed and produced by Don Siegel, and starring Michael Caine, Donald Pleasence, Delphine Seyrig, Clive Revill, John Vernon, Joss Ackland and Janet Suzman. Caine portrays a British intelligence officer whose son is kidnapped and held for ransom. The screenplay is based on Clive Egleton's 1973 novel Seven Days to a Killing.

The film was a British and American co-production, distributed by Universal Pictures (internationally from Cinema International Corporation). It premiered in New York City on May 17, 1974, and received mixed reviews from critics.

== Plot ==
Two schoolboys are playing with a model plane on an abandoned military base in the English countryside. They are approached by two RAF personnel who rebuke them for trespassing, and take them to see their commanding officer. It soon becomes apparent that they are not really in the military and the two boys are kidnapped.

In London, British intelligence officer Maj. John Tarrant, is engaged in an undercover operation to try to infiltrate a gang of arms smugglers – who are selling weapons to terrorists in Northern Ireland. He makes an initial approach with Celia Burrows, a member of the organisation. He arranges to come back the next week to meet her boss. He then heads to a large country house, where MI6 chief Sir Edward Julyan lives, and makes a report about his operation to Julyan and his direct superior, Cedric Harper. While he is there he receives a telephone call from his wife – who tells him their son David has been taken and she has received a strange phone call. Tarrant reacts calmly, revealing to his superiors only that he has a family problem, and is given permission to leave.

Tarrant goes to his wife's home in time to receive a second call from a man identifying himself as Drabble. Drabble demonstrates he knows exactly who Tarrant is and what jobs he does. He instructs him to get Harper to answer the next phone call – making it clear he has Tarrant's son David and is prepared to torture him. Tarrant goes to Harper, and informs him of the situation. Harper agrees to take the phone call and begins to put a surveillance operation into motion – to discover the identity of Drabble. When Drabble gets in touch, he demands that Harper give him £517,057 in uncut diamonds and make a rendezvous in Paris. Harper had recently acquired that exact amount of diamonds to fund another operation he has planned. Harper deduces that Drabble must be acting with information supplied by a member of British intelligence. He immediately begins to suspect Tarrant of staging the kidnapping, and has him placed under observation. Tarrant, meanwhile, has to assign his arms-smuggling case to another officer.

The Drabble gang have placed incriminating evidence into Tarrant's flat, which appears to show a relationship with Celia Burrows, and this is found by Metropolitan Police officers conducting a search. This further fuels Harper's belief that Tarrant has in fact arranged the entire kidnapping himself. Harper meets with Tarrant in his office and tells him that he cannot allow the ransom to be met, as the British government does not negotiate with terrorists. Tarrant seemingly accepts this, but when Harper has departed, he breaks into his office and impersonates Harper on a secure telephone – arranging to have the diamonds made available. He then takes them to Paris to make the rendezvous – giving the slip to the tail Harper has placed on him. In Paris, he is met by Celia Burrows at the rendezvous. She takes him to a building where it is claimed Tarrant's son is being held.

It soon becomes apparent to Tarrant that Drabble has not got his son there. Instead Drabble makes a cryptic reference to a place in Southern England where there is a view of two windmills. Once he has got the diamonds the ruthless Drabble murders Celia Burrows, and leaves an unconscious Tarrant lying beside the corpse. Tarrant is arrested by the French police – and handed over to Harper and British intelligence. A rescue is then staged by Drabble gang, freeing Tarrant from Harper's custody, but then trying to murder him. Tarrant manages to escape and head back to England. He realises that Drabble meant to try to silence him for good – therefore protecting whoever in British intelligence was supplying him from information. Tarrant then attempts to flush out the traitor, by pretending to be Drabble and arranging a rendezvous at the two windmills with various senior British officers which he now knows to be the Clayton Windmills near Brighton.

The man who comes to the rendezvous is Sir Edward Julyan who is ambushed by Tarrant. Under duress he admits that he arranged the whole thing, having been passed over for a promotion and urgently needed large amounts of money to enjoy a comfortable retirement with his free-spending wife. He tries to get Tarrant to accept half the value of the diamonds, but he refuses – and instead demands to know the whereabouts of his son. Julyan tells him that he is being held in the black windmill by Drabble. Tarrant then enters the windmill, kills Drabble and his henchman and then rescues his son, David. The film ends with Tarrant carrying David along the road from the windmill, to the sound of the song "Underneath the spreading chestnut tree" which was heard at the start of the film.

== Cast ==
- Michael Caine as Major John Tarrant
- Donald Pleasence as Cedric Harper
- Delphine Seyrig as Celia Burrows
- Clive Revill as Alf Chestermann
- John Vernon as McKee
- Joss Ackland as Chief Superintendent Wray
- Janet Suzman as Alex Tarrant
- Catherine Schell as Lady Melissa Julyan
- Joseph O'Conor as Sir Edward Julyan
- Denis Quilley as Bateson
- Edward Hardwicke as Mike McCarthy
- Paul Moss as David Tarrant
- Derek Newark as Surveillance Officer
- Maureen Pryor as Mrs Harper
- Joyce Carey as Harper's secretary
- Preston Lockwood as Ilkeston
- Molly Urquhart as Margaret
- David Daker as MI5 man
- Hermione Baddeley as Hetty
- Patrick Barr as General St John

Uncredited

- Russell Napier as Admiral Ballantyne
- Yves Afonso as Jacques
- Robert Dorning as jeweller
- John Rhys-Davies as fake policeman

== Production ==
=== Writing ===
The screenplay was written by Leigh Vance, adapted from Clive Egleton's 1973 novel Seven Days to a Killing. The working title of the film was Drabble.

=== Filming ===
The film was made, in part, on location at Clayton Windmills, south of Burgess Hill, in West Sussex, England. It also featured scenes filmed in London at Aldwych, Shepherd's Bush tube stations, and The Red Lion public house in the Duke of York Street. A section of the film was also shot at Pegwell Bay, Ramsgate Hoverport, where Tarrant makes his way across the channel and sneaks onto the back of a bus which is on board the hovercraft Sure. Other scenes were filmed in Paris, and on sets at Twickenham Film Studios.

During filming, actress Nina van Pallandt was replaced by Delphine Seyrig, reportedly after refusing to perform a nude scene.

== Reception ==
=== Box office ===
The film opened at the Radio City Music Hall in New York City on 16 May 1974 and grossed $151,269 in its opening week.

=== Critical response ===
On the review aggregation website Rotten Tomatoes, the film has a 57% approval rating based on 7 reviews.

A review in the New York Times gave the film a mixed reaction describing it as a "thoroughly professional job" but criticising its lack of invention and the failure of Caine's character to demonstrate any emotion about his son's kidnapping. Donald Pleasence's performance as the fastidious Harper was praised. It concluded "in the age of Watergate, we need nimbler or more fantastic material to engage us — to grab our attention from wondering what may be on the news tonight". Roger Ebert for Chicago Sun-Times gave the film two out of four stars, writing "The Black Windmill commits the one crime no thriller can be pardoned for. It's not thrilling. It's also terribly passive and static, and Siegel directs Caine almost to a standstill."

In a more positive review, Penelope Gilliatt for The New Yorker wrote "The film is full of set pieces that are nearly up to 007 at his groomed best, except that Michael Caine is no mere gamesman at showing off. He makes peril seem real."
