= Harry Handelsman =

British businessman

- Born: September 1949 (age 76)
- Education: York University
- Occupation: Property Developer
- Known for: Founder and CEO, Manhattan Loft Corporation
- Partner: Elizabeth Crompton-Batt
- Children: 2

Harry Handelsman (born September 1949) is the founder and CEO of Manhattan Loft Corporation, a London-based property development company.

== Early life ==
Harry Handelsman was born in September 1949, the son of a "well-off Polish financier", Handelsman was born in Munich. He was educated in Germany, Paris and Canada, and has a master's degree in economics from York University in Toronto.

His father died in 1982, and he then took over running the business, and moved to London in 1983.

== Career ==
Handelsman established London-based Manhattan Loft Corporation in 1992. Since then, he has gone on to re-develop "some of London’s most admired buildings", including the Chiltern Firehouse and St. Pancras Renaissance London Hotel

== Manhattan Loft Corporation developments ==
=== Chiltern Firehouse ===
A collaboration with Andre Balazs, Manhattan Loft Corporation redeveloped the Grade II 19th-century Manchester Square Fire Station into a 26-suite hotel and 200 capacity restaurant. Chiltern Firehouse opened in 2014 after nearly five years of re-development

Chiltern Firehouse was designed in conjunction with Studio KO, and, in addition to its 26 suites, includes bar areas and a restaurant run by former Viajante chef Nuno Mendes – whose cuisine has been described as "unique" and "stylish".

=== Hackney Walk ===
Launched in Spring 2016, Manhattan Loft Corporation collaborated with architect David Adjaye to create a designer fashion outlet district in London's Hackney. However the project was largely unsuccessful with only a single store remaining open in 2023.

=== St Pancras Renaissance Hotel ===
Designed by George Gilbert Scott in the 19th century, the former Grand Midland Hotel became derelict in the late 20th-century. Planning permission to re-develop the derelict building was granted to Manhattan Loft Corporation in 2004. The upper levels of the gothic structure were developed into 67 apartments, and a 245-room hotel was opened in 2011 after the ten-year restoration work. The St Pancras Renaissance Hotel remains under Handelsman's ownership

=== Ealing Studios ===
Ealing Studios, built in 1902, is Britain's oldest film studio. In the mid-2000s, Handelsman purchased the site along with Fragile Films' Uri Fruchtmann and Barnaby Thompson; all of whom are directors. Manhattan Loft Corporation went on to re-develop the site to include the existing Grade II listed sound stages. Manhattan Loft Corporation remains linked to Ealing Studios as the company is working on the second phase of its restoration and expansion.

=== Manhattan Loft Gardens ===
Manhattan Loft Gardens is a 42-storey skyscraper in Stratford, East London. It has been designed by architects Skidmore, Owings & Merrill. The double-cantilevered, 135 m tower includes 248 flats, a hotel, a restaurant, and three sky gardens. It was completed in 2019.

== Awards and recognition ==
In 2012, it was announced that Handelsman had received an honorary fellowship from the Royal Institute of British Architects (RIBA) Handelsman was listed in the Evening Standard's "Progress 1000" in both 2015 and 2016; a list of London's 1000 most influential people.

== Other ==
Handelsman sits on the board of Artangel, the Southbank Centre and The South London Gallery.

== Personal life ==
His "long-term partner" is Elizabeth Crompton-Batt, the former wife of the late restaurant PR Alan Crompton-Batt, and they have a daughter together. They live in Bayswater, London, with Handelsman's flat tailored by Sarah Featherstone. Handelsman also has a daughter from a previous marriage.
