= Narrative environment =

A narrative environment is a space, whether physical or virtual, in which stories can unfold. A virtual narrative environment might be the narrative framework in which game play can proceed. A physical narrative environment might be an exhibition area within a museum, or a foyer of a retail space, or the public spaces around a building - anywhere in short where stories can be told in space. It is also a term coined by the Central Saint Martin's College of Art and Design programme where the first Narrative Environment course was introduced in 2003. It is a full-time, 2 year Masters level course leading to an MA degree. Originally called in Creative Practice for Narrative Environments, now M.A. for Narrative Environments.
