= St Pancras London Hotel =

Hotel in London

St. Pancras London, Autograph Collection

- Location within Central London
- Hotel chain: Autograph Collection

General information
- Location: Euston Road, London, UK
- Coordinates: 51°31′48″N 0°07′31″W
- Opened: 2011 (originally 1873 as Midland Grand Hotel)
- Owner: Manhattan Loft Corporation
- Operator: Marriott International

Height
- Height: 76 m (249 ft)

Design and construction
- Architect: George Gilbert Scott
- Developer: Manhattan Loft Corporation

Other information
- Number of rooms: 207
- Number of suites: 38
- Number of restaurants: 2

Website
- Official website

The St. Pancras London, Autograph Collection hotel is part of the main building at St Pancras railway station in St Pancras, London. The station is one of the main rail termini in London and the final stop for international Eurostar trains departing to Paris, Brussels, Amsterdam and other destinations in mainland Europe. It re-opened in 2011, and occupies much of the former Midland Grand Hotel designed by George Gilbert Scott which opened in 1873 and closed in 1935. The hotel is managed by Marriott International.

The building as a whole including the apartments is known as St Pancras Chambers and between 1935 and the 1980s was used as railway offices. The upper levels of the original building were redeveloped between 2005 and 2011 as apartments by the Manhattan Loft Corporation. Its clock tower stands at 76 m (249 ft) tall, with more than half its height usable.

The hotel is located in the vicinity of Euston, King's Cross and St Pancras railway stations.

== History ==
=== Midland Grand Hotel ===
In 1865 the Midland Railway Company held a competition for the design of a 150-bed hotel to be constructed next to its railway station, St Pancras, which was still under construction at the time. Eleven designs were submitted, including one by George Gilbert Scott, which, at 300 rooms, was much bigger and more expensive than the original specifications. Despite this, the company liked his plans and construction began. Scott's design was for a hotel with five floors below roof level but in the event it was built with four (which remains the case today) to save on construction costs – although the Midland Railway frequently reproduced Scott's original impression, showing the hotel with its non-existent top floor, in its publicity material. The east wing opened on 5 May 1873, with the Midland Railway appointing Herr Etzensberger (formerly of the Victoria Hotel, Venice) as general manager. The hotel was completed in spring 1876.

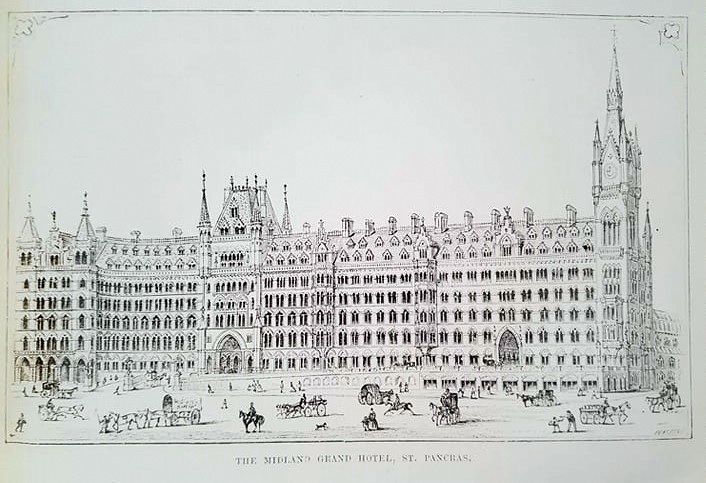
Design of the Midland Grand Hotel St Pancras, showing the fifth floor which was not built, c. 1876

The hotel was expensive, with costly fixtures including a grand staircase, rooms with gold leaf walls and a fireplace in every room. It had many innovative features such as hydraulic lifts, concrete floors, revolving doors and fireproof floor constructions, though none of the rooms had bathrooms, as was the convention of the time.

The hotel was taken over by the London, Midland and Scottish Railway in 1922 before closing in 1935, by which time its utilities were outdated and too costly to maintain, such as the armies of servants needed to carry chamber pots, tubs, bowls and spittoons.

=== Rail use and preservation ===
After closing as a hotel, the building was renamed St Pancras Chambers and used as railway offices, eventually for British Rail.

British Rail had hoped to demolish it, but was opposed in a high-profile campaign by Jane Hughes Fawcett and her colleagues at the Victorian Society, a historic preservationist organisation founded in part to preserve the Victorian railways and other buildings. Officials dubbed Jane Fawcett the "furious Mrs Fawcett" for her unceasing efforts, and in 1967, the Hotel and the St Pancras station received Grade I listed status.

The building continued its use as rail offices, until the 1980s when it failed fire safety regulations and was shut down. The exterior was restored and made structurally sound at a cost of around £10 million in the 1990s.

=== Reopening as hotel and apartments ===
Planning permission was granted in 2004 for the building to be redeveloped into a new hotel.

The main public rooms of the old Midland Grand were restored, along with some of the bedrooms. The former driveway for taxis entering St. Pancras station, passing under the main tower of the building, was converted into the hotel's lobby. In order to cater for the more modern expectations of guests, a new bedroom wing was constructed on the western side of the Barlow train shed.

As redeveloped the hotel contains 244 bedrooms, two restaurants, two bars, a health and leisure centre, a ballroom, and 20 meeting and function rooms. The architects for the redevelopment were Aedas RHWL. At the same time, the upper floors of the original building were redeveloped as 68 apartments by the Manhattan Loft Corporation.

The St. Pancras London, Autograph Collection opened on 14 March 2011 to guests; however, the formal Grand Opening was on 5 May – exactly 138 years after its original opening in 1873.

The hotel was transferred from Marriott's Renaissance Hotels brand to its Autograph Collection brand on 3 June 2025, and was renamed St. Pancras London, Autograph Collection. Also as part of the rebranding, the Chambers Club, exclusive to guests in the Chambers' rooms in the hotel, was closed.

== Media appearances ==
The exterior and interior of the hotel were used as locations in the 1995 film Richard III starring Ian McKellen, serving as King Edward's Palace.

The 1988 Douglas Adams novel The Long Dark Tea-Time of the Soul uses the derelict Midland Grand as the real world alternative to the Norse Gods' Valhalla. He described it as a "huge, dark Gothic fantasy of a building which stands, empty and desolate… its roof line a vast assortment of wild turrets, gnarled spires and pinnacles which seemed to prod at and goad the night sky".

The video for the 1996 song Wannabe by the Spice Girls was filmed at the Midland Grand Hotel. The music video was filmed in the entrance and main staircase of the building.

In Christopher Nolan's 2005 film Batman Begins, the Arkham Asylum stairwell was filmed in the hotel.

The staircase was also the setting for Mistlethwaite Manor in the 1993 film production of The Secret Garden.

In 2003, the television series Most Haunted Live broadcast a live event from the building, the theme being "Peril in St. Pancras".

The hotel and train station were chosen to act as King's Cross station's exteriors for Harry Potter and the Chamber of Secrets and Harry Potter and the Deathly Hallows – Part 2, on the filmmakers' reasoning that their Gothic architecture was considered far more impressive. Like the real King's Cross, the St. Pancras London, Autograph Collection Hotel also became popular with tourists doing Harry Potter tours.

== Gallery ==
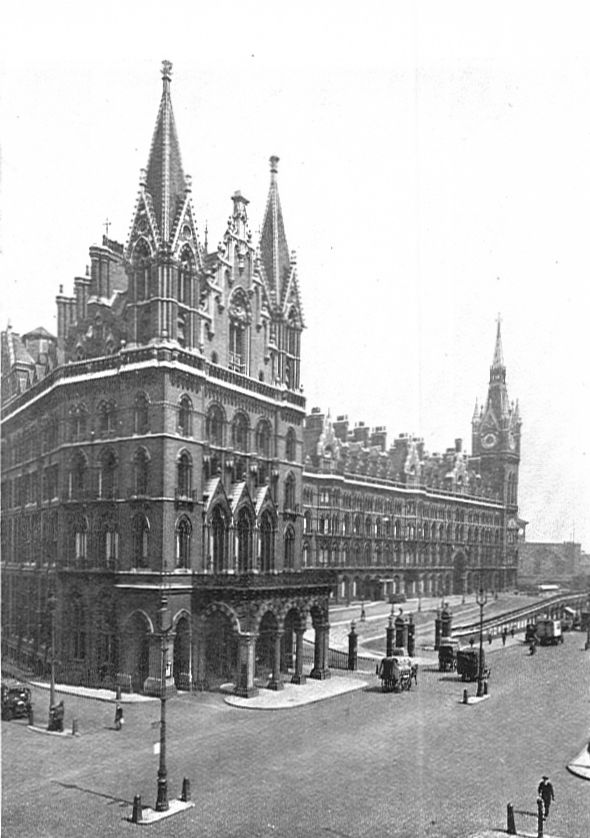
The hotel in 1928

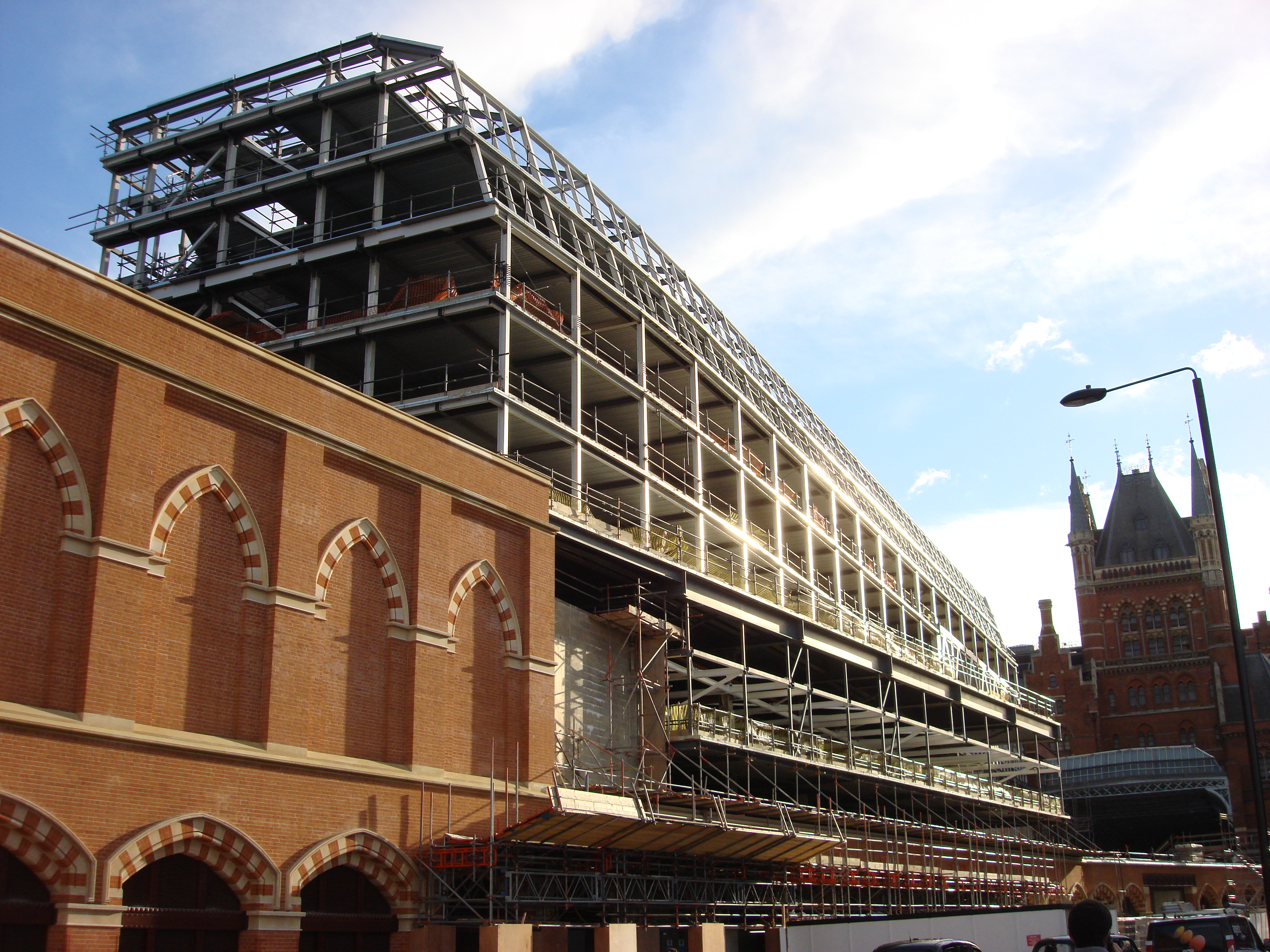
The new bedroom wing under construction

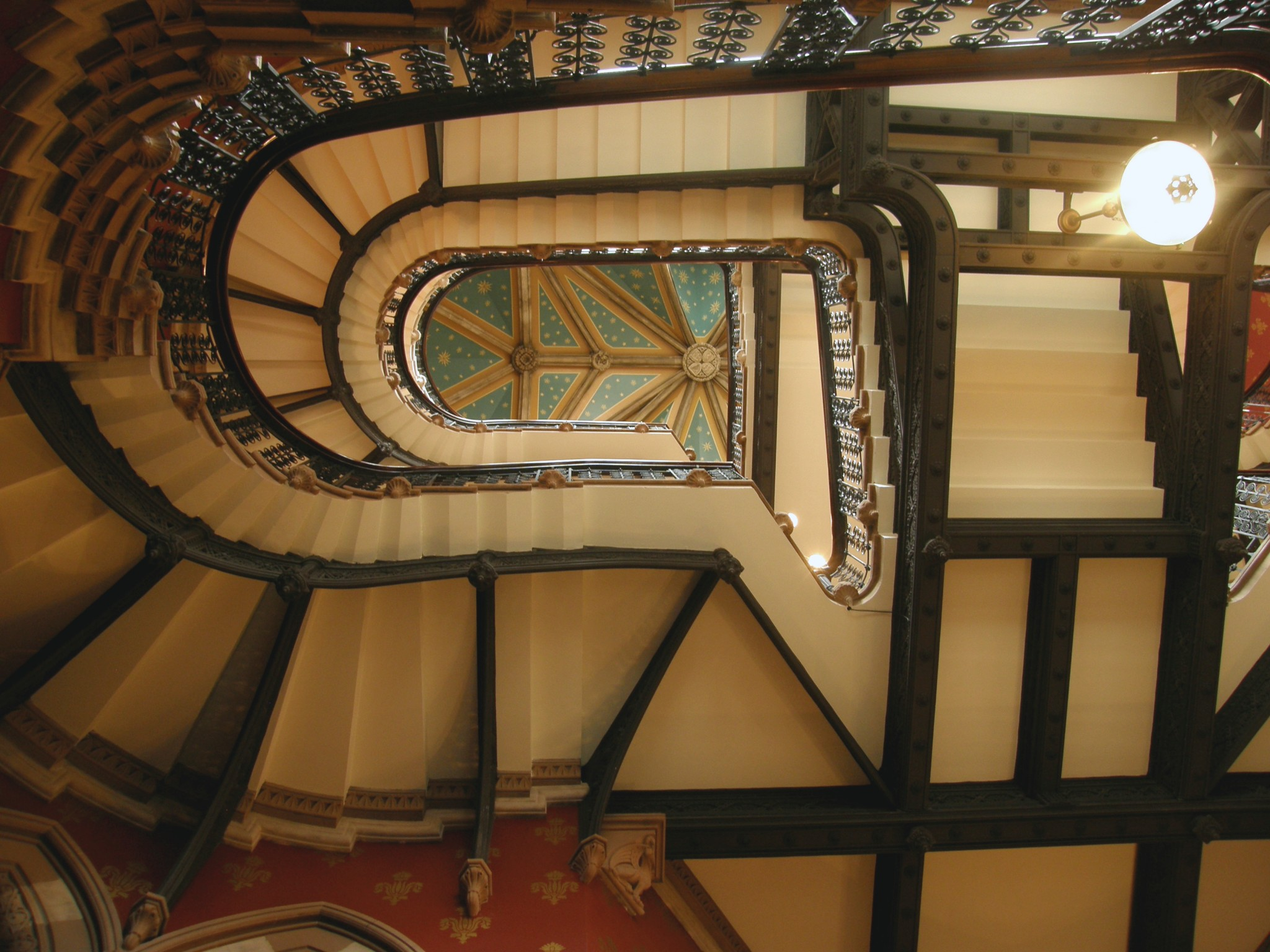
George Gilbert Scott's Grand Staircase

Bottom of the Grand Staircase

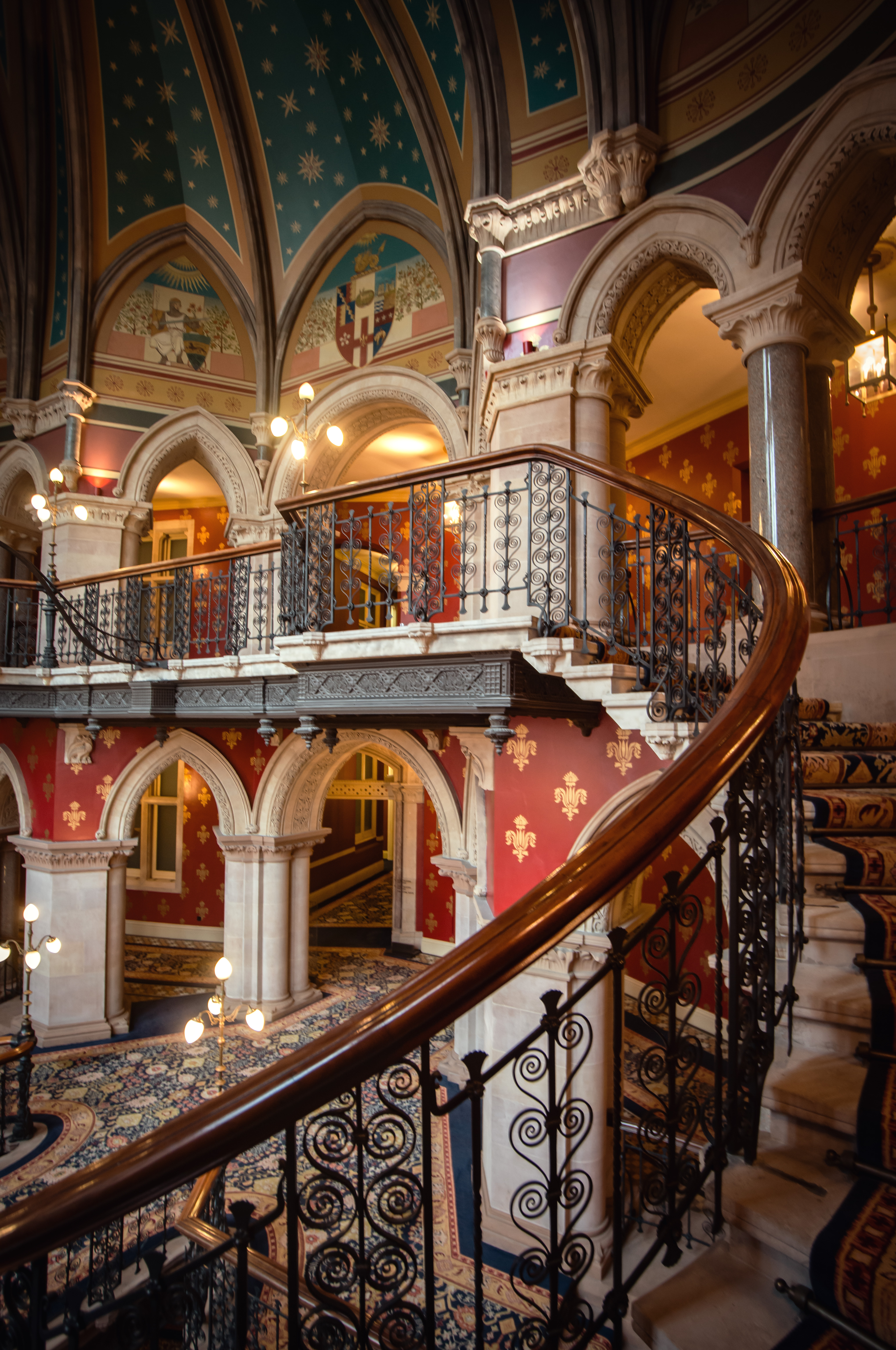
The top floor of the Grand Staircase

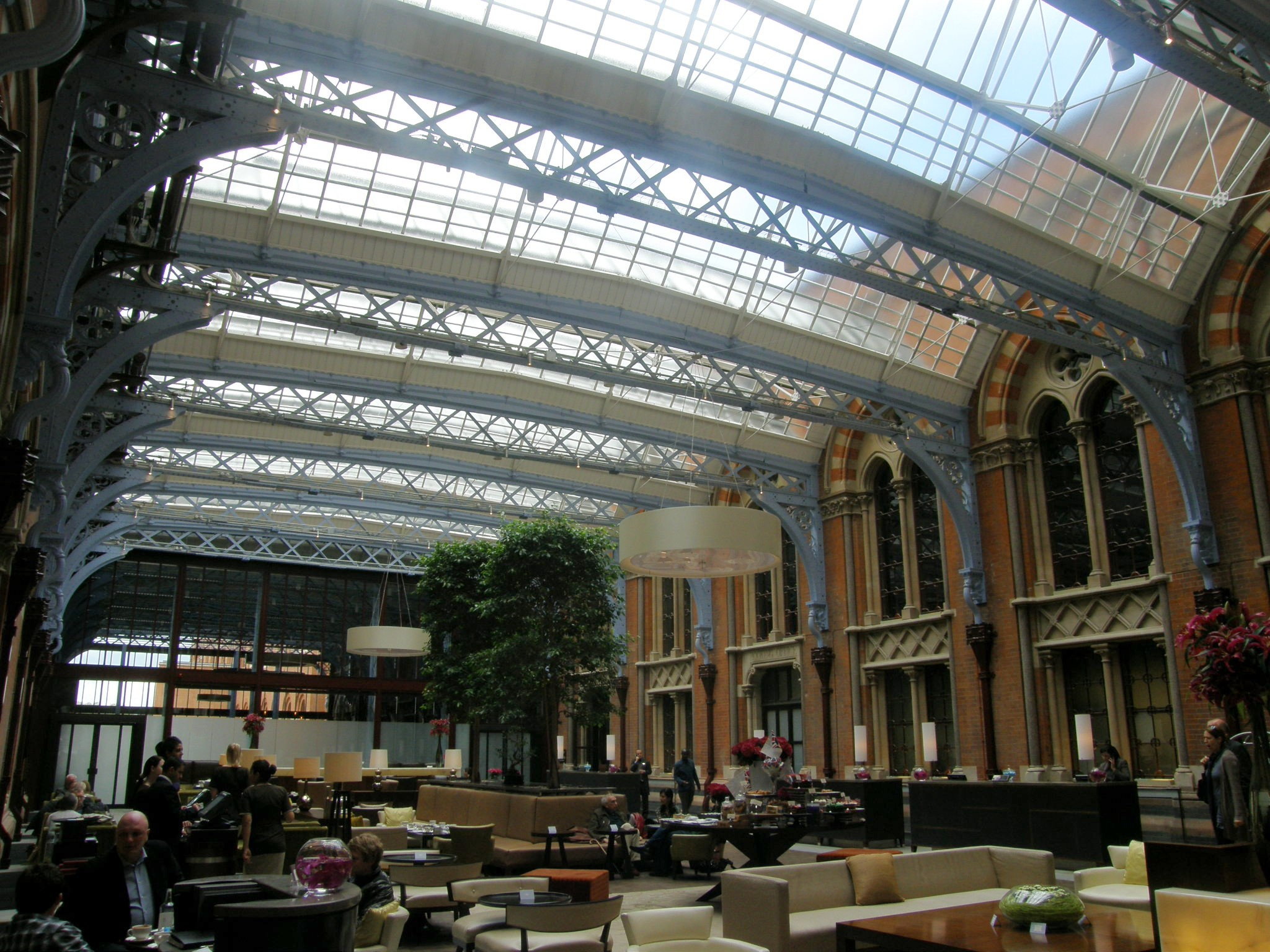
The hotel atrium, formerly the taxi entry driveway to St. Pancras station

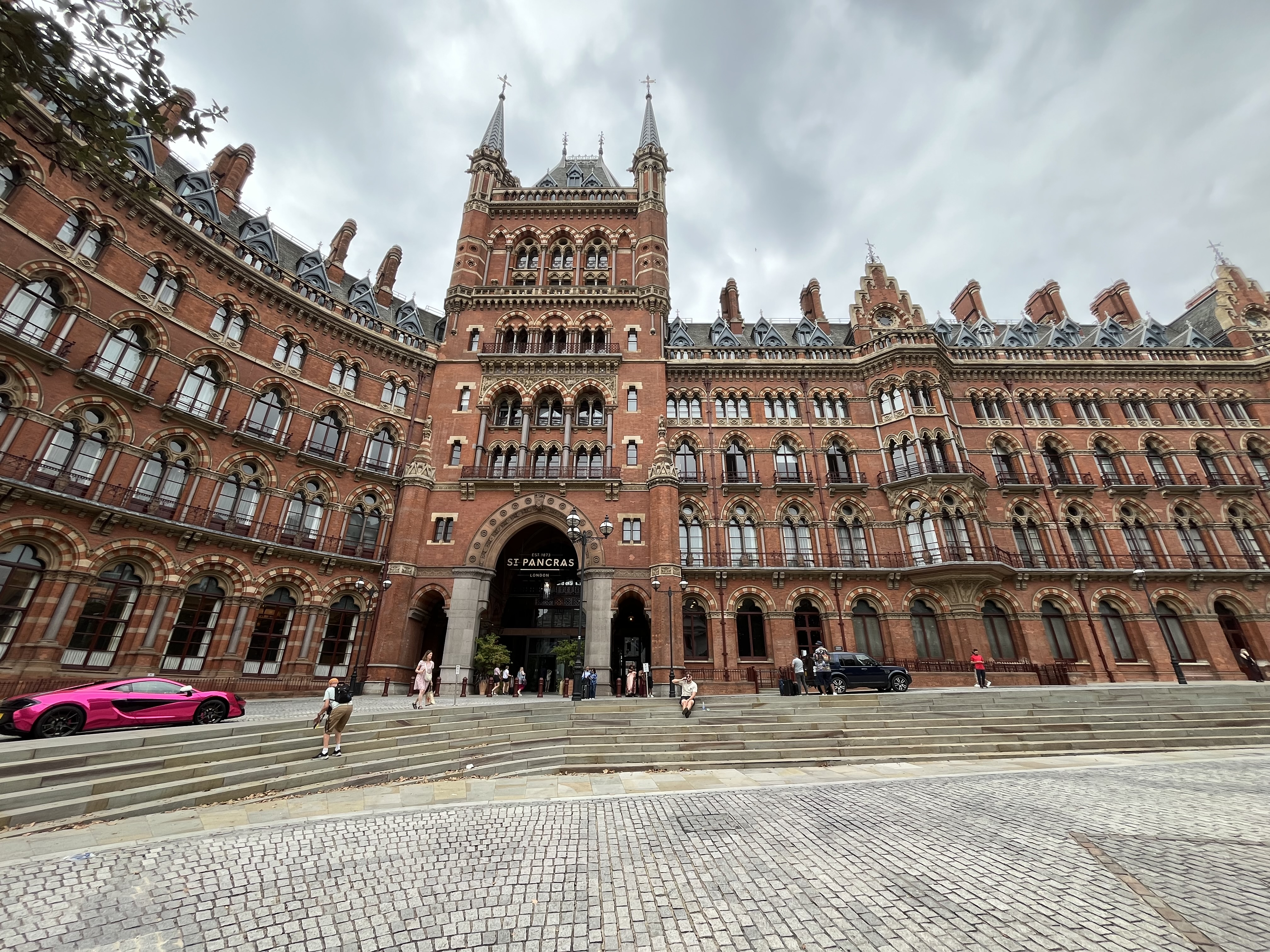
The hotel in 2025
