= Wild basil =

"Wild basil" is a common name for several plants in the mint family (Lamiaceae):

- the genus Clinopodium, in particular:
  - Clinopodium vulgare (wild basil)
  - Clinopodium menthifolium subsp. ascendens (ascending wild basil)
  - Clinopodium gracile (slender wild basil)
  - Clinopodium arkansanum (low calamint, limestone wild basil)
- Cunila origanoides (dittany)
- Ocimum gratissimum (African basil), e.g. in Hawai'i
- Perilla frutescens (perilla)
- the genus Pycnanthemum (mountainmints), in particular:
  - Pycnanthemum incanum (hoary mountainmint), e.g. in the continental U.S.
  - Pycnanthemum setosum
  - Pycnanthemum verticillatum
  - Pycnanthemum virginianum
