= Downlands Community School =

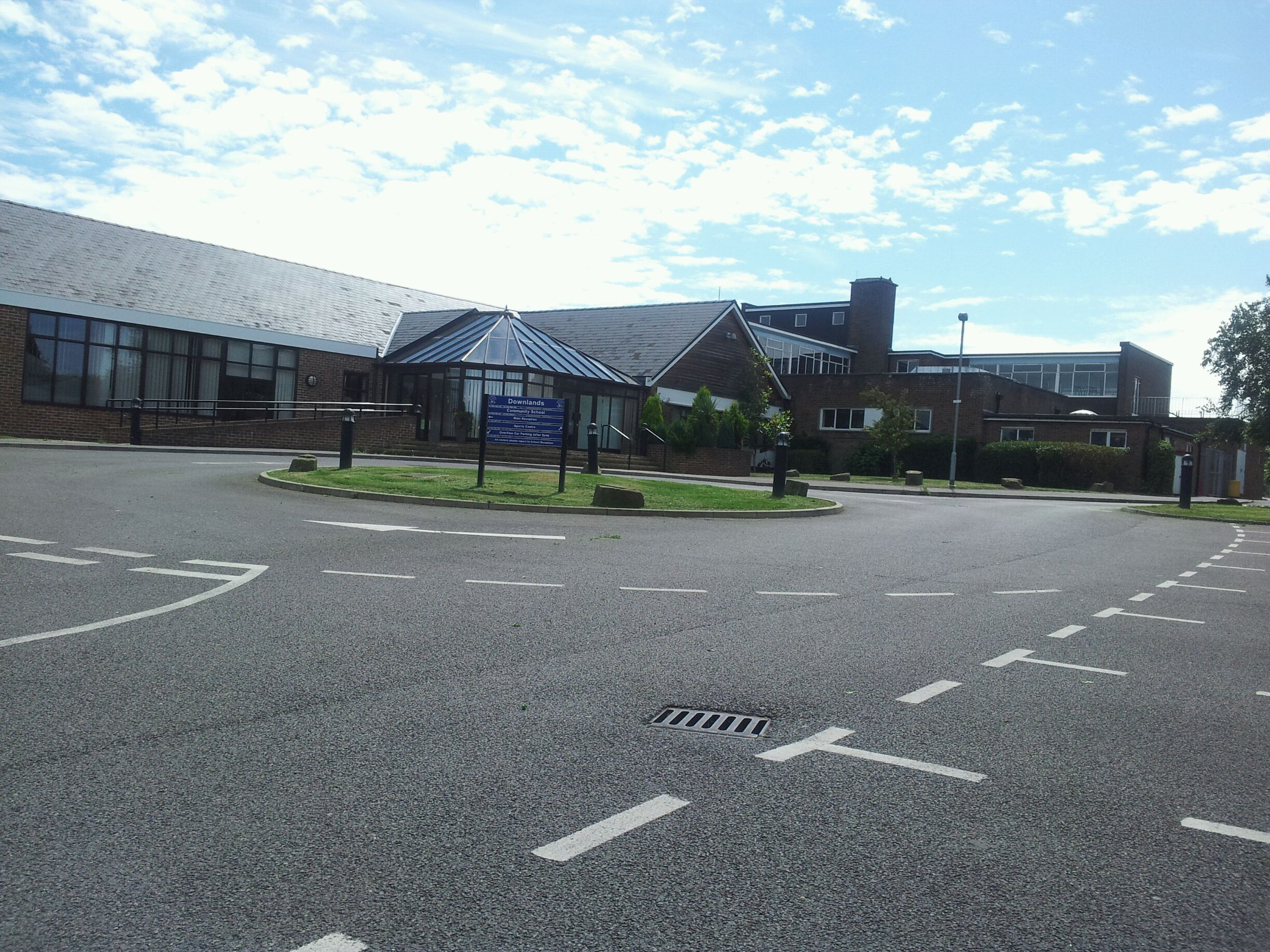

Location
- Dale Avenue; Hassocks, West Sussex, BN6 8LP; England; 50°55′17″N 0°08′19″W

Information
- Type: Community school
- Local authority: West Sussex
- Department for Education URN: 126087 Tables
- Ofsted: Reports
- Headteacher: Matthew Ashdown
- Gender: Coeducational
- Age: 11 to 16
- Enrolment: 1255
- Capacity: 1200
- Website: www.downlands.w-sussex.sch.uk

Downlands Community School is a maintained comprehensive secondary school in Hassocks, West Sussex, England, for pupils aged 11 to 16. It has about 1200 pupils. In October 2022, Ofsted inspected the school and reported that the school was 'good' in all areas.

== Facilities ==
The school has a maths block, sports hall and a generation three AstroTurf open air training pitch. The sports hall and astroturf pitch are managed, on behalf of the school, by Freedom Leisure and are used by the local community after school hours.

== Academic achievement ==
In 2025, the school got its best ever results, with attainment score of 8 / 56.18 (equivalent of about a 6 out of a 9, or a high B using older grading systems). 85% of pupils achieved grade 4 or above in English and Maths.
