= Clayton Windmills =

Three windmills in West Sussex, England

The Clayton Windmills, known locally as Jack and Jill, stand on the South Downs above the village of Clayton, West Sussex, England. They comprise a post mill and a tower mill, and the roundhouse of a former post mill. All three are Grade II* listed buildings.

== Setting and access ==
The windmills stand atop the South Downs with views of the Sussex Weald. They are 7 miles (11 km) north of the city of Brighton and Hove. As well as Jack and Jill, the roundhouse of Duncton Mill survives, located a short distance east of Jack.

The mills are accessible by road at the end of Mill Lane from the A273 road where it crosses the South Downs. There is free parking in the car park beside the mills.

== History ==
=== Duncton Mill ===
Duncton Mill

Origin
- Grid reference: TQ 304 135
- Coordinates: 50.9052°N 0.1475°W
- Operator(s): Jack and Jill Windmills Society
- Year built: 1765

Information
- Purpose: Corn mill
- Type: Post mill
- Roundhouse storeys: Single storey roundhouse
- No. of sails: Four
- Type of sails: Common sails
- Winding: Tailpole
- No. of pairs of millstones: Two pairs, arranged Head and Tail
- Other information: Demolished in 1866, roundhouse remains standing.

Duncton Mill was built in 1765. It was owned by Viscount Montague and leased for 99 years. Duncton Mill was demolished in 1866, leaving the roundhouse to be used as a store.

==== Description ====
Duncton Mill was a post mill with a single storey roundhouse, four common sails. It was winded by hand and had two pairs of millstones. The head wheel from Duncton Mill was used as the brake wheel in Jack when that mill was built.

=== Jill ===
Jill
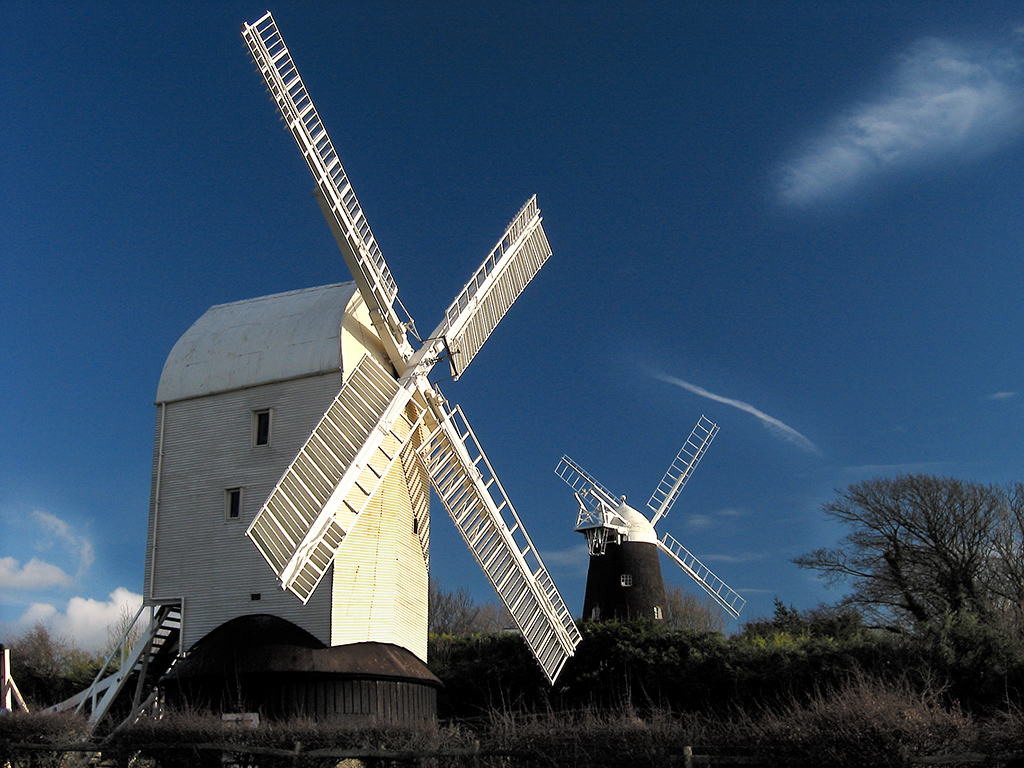
- Jill (foreground) and Jack (background)

Origin
- Grid reference: TQ 304 134
- Operator(s): Jack and Jill Windmills Society
- Year built: 1821

Information
- Purpose: Corn mill
- Type: Post mill
- Base storeys: Two storey roundhouse
- No. of sails: Four
- Type of sails: Patent sails
- Windshaft: Wood, with cast iron poll end
- Winding: Tailpole mounted fantail
- Fantail blades: Five blades
- No. of pairs of millstones: Two pairs, arranged head and tail
- Other information: Moved from Brighton in 1852. Main post constructed of four pieces of timber.

Jill is a post mill originally built in Dyke Road, Brighton, in 1821. It was known as Lashmar's New Mill and was built to replace Lashmar's Old Mill. In 1830 the windshaft broke, bringing the sails crashing to the ground. A painting by Nash dated 1839 and an engraving in the Handbook to Brighton (1847) show her to have had a roof mounted fantail, similar to the arrangement still found on Icklesham windmill. Lashmar's New Mill was the most southerly of the three Dyke Road post mills. In 1852 she was moved to Clayton by a team of horses and oxen. The site is now Belmont—a short street of Grade II listed villas.

The working life of the mills ended in 1906 and in 1908 Jill was damaged in a storm. She lost her fantail and sails over the years until in 1953 restoration was carried out by E Hole and Son, the Burgess Hill millwrights, funded by Cuckfield Rural District Council. In 1978 restoration of Jill to working order was commenced. Jill ground flour again in 1986. During the Great Storm of 1987, Jill's brakes had been applied prior to the storm's arrival, but the extreme winds were able to turn the sails, overcoming the brakes and generating friction which set the mill on fire. Some members of the Windmill Society were able to get to the mill and save her by carrying water up the hill to put the fire out.

Today, Jill is in working order and open to the public most Sundays between May and September. She produces stoneground wholemeal flour on an occasional basis. The vast majority of her flour is sold to visitors. It is ground from organic wheat, grown locally in Sussex. On the occasions when the wind is blowing and Jill is in operation, a guide is available to explain the process of milling. Jill is owned by Mid Sussex District.

==== Description ====
Jill is a post mill with a two-storey roundhouse. She has four patent sails and is winded by a five blade fantail mounted on the tailpole. The windshaft is wooden, with a cast iron poll end dated 1831. Jill has two pairs of millstones, arranged head and tail. The compass arm tail wheel shows evidence of having been used as a brake wheel at some time. The main post of Jill is made from four separate pieces of timber, a feature seen in some Sussex post mills and only found in this and Argos Hill Mill today.

=== Jack ===
Jack
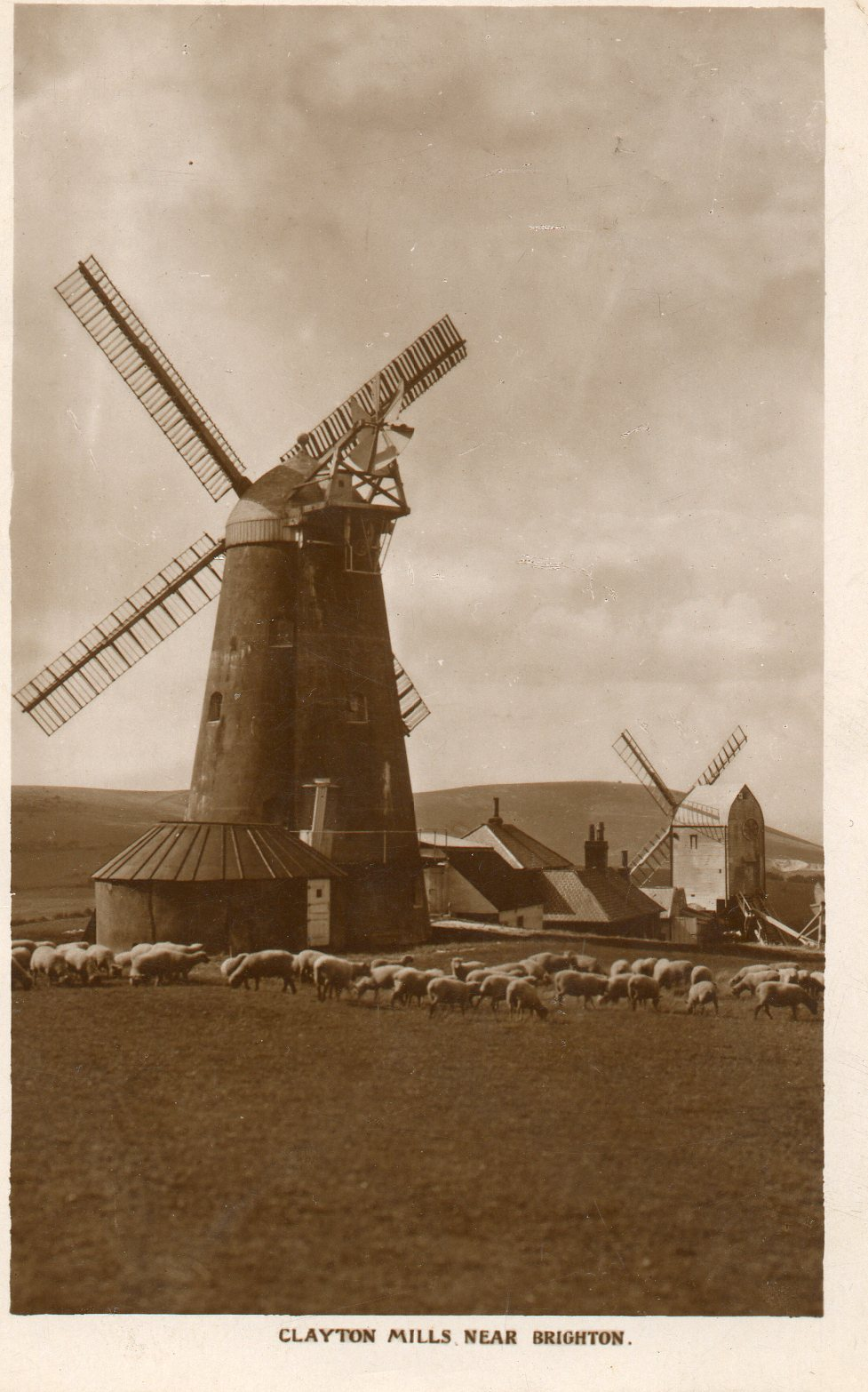
- Jack, with the roundhouse of Duncton Mill in the foreground

Origin
- Grid reference: TQ 304 135
- Year built: 1866

Information
- Purpose: Corn mill
- Type: Tower mill
- Storeys: Five storeys
- No. of sails: Four
- Type of sails: Patent sails
- Windshaft: Cast iron
- Winding: Fantail
- Fantail blades: Five blades
- Other information: Was fitted with Hammond's Patent Sweep Governor. Brake wheel was formerly in Duncton Mill.

Jack is a five-storey tower mill built in 1866 to replace Duncton Mill. Worked as a pair with Jill, Jack worked until c. 1907. Unusually Jack mill has a male name — almost every other mill in the country is considered female. In 1928 while a pit was being dug for a water tank, an Anglo-Saxon skeleton was discovered. It was later removed to the British Museum. Jack was owned by barrister Jolyon Maugham for several years.

==== Description ====
Jack is a five-storey tower mill with a domed cap. He carries four patent sails and was winded by a five blade fantail. There was a stage at first floor level. It is believed that Jack was built by the millwright Cooper, of Henfield. In 1873 Jack was fitted with Hammond's Patent Sweep Governor, a feature also fitted to the post mill at Herstmonceux, which was also run by the Hammonds. Jack had three pairs of millstones, and room for a fourth pair. All machinery below windshaft level has been removed. In 1966 Jack was fitted with new sails as he was to appear in a film. Jack is 44 feet (13.41 m) to the curb, 22 feet 8 inches (6.91 m) diameter at the base and 13 feet (3.96 m) diameter at the curb. The present owners have lived at the windmill since 2012. The mill house and granary were built for them by architect Sarah Featherstone of Featherstone Young in 2016. The granary retains the historical beams and original footprint of the 18th century granary, while the mill house is a reconfiguration of Henry Longhurst's house. Together, the buildings connect Jack and Jill on a straight axis, opening up views throughout the site.

== Gallery ==
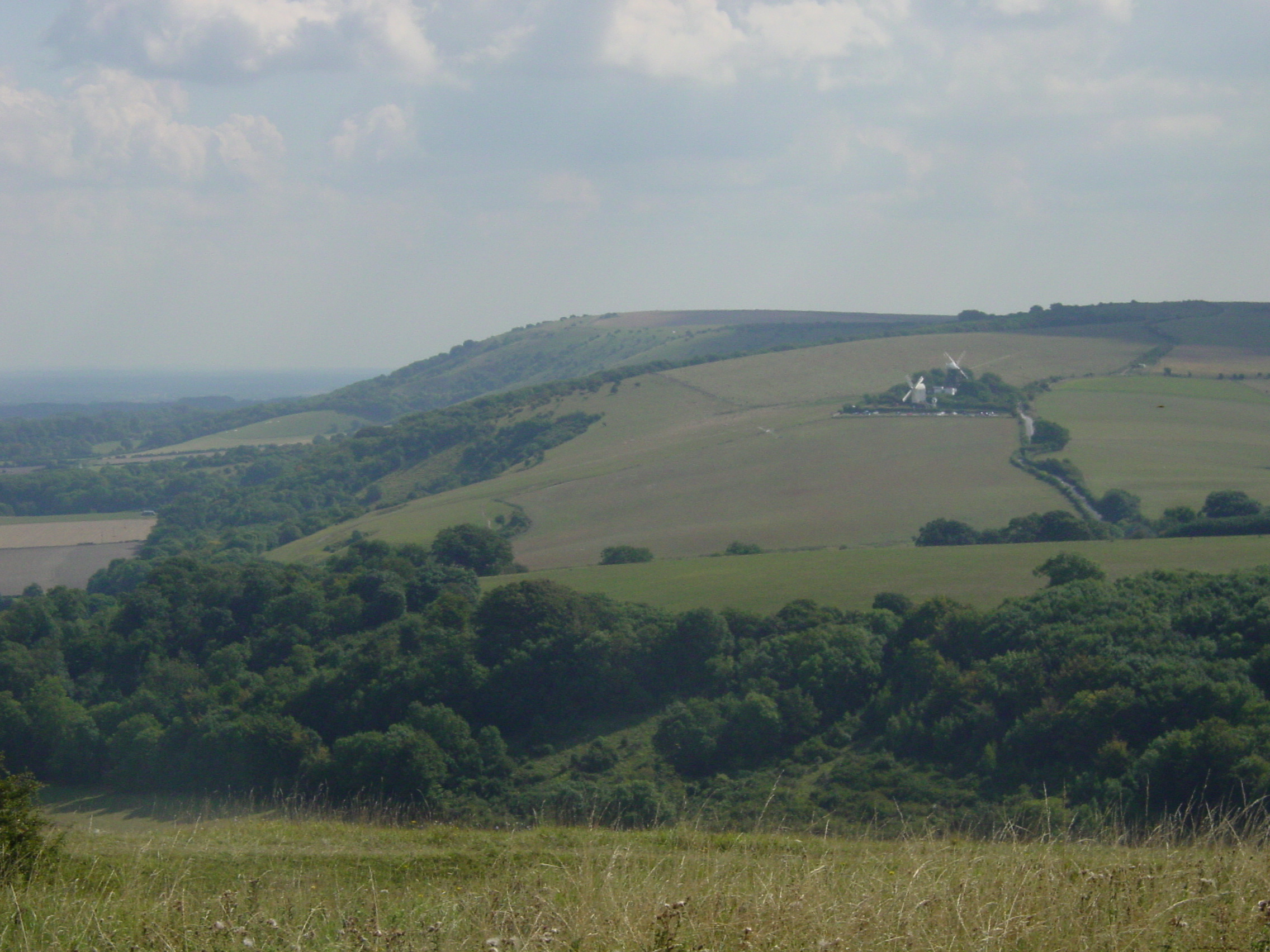
Jack and Jill (the tiny white dots middle-right) in relation to the Sussex landscape

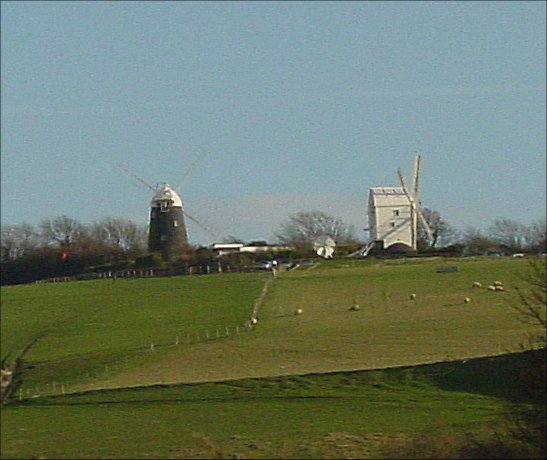
Jack (left) and Jill (right)

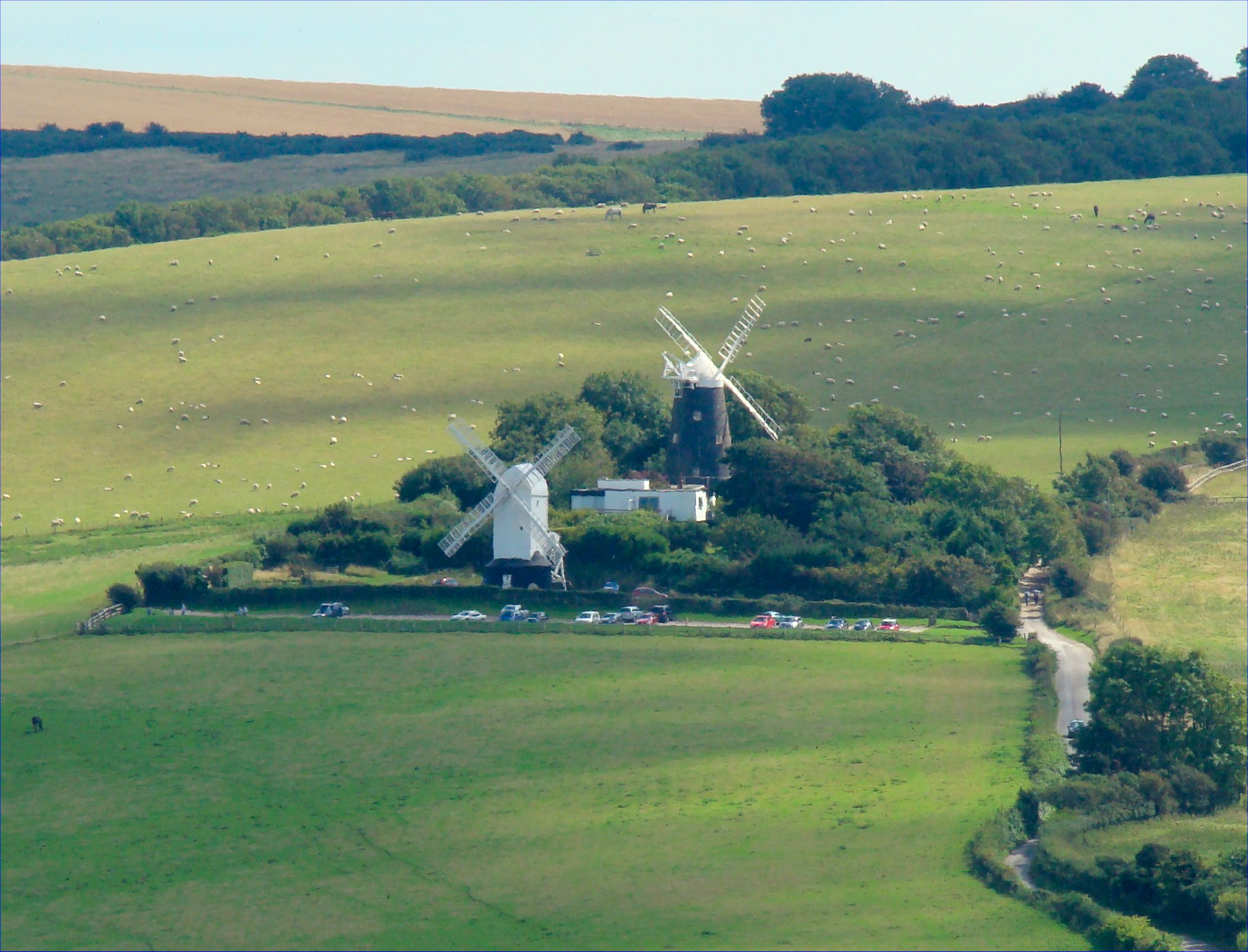
Jack and Jill from Wolstonbury Hill

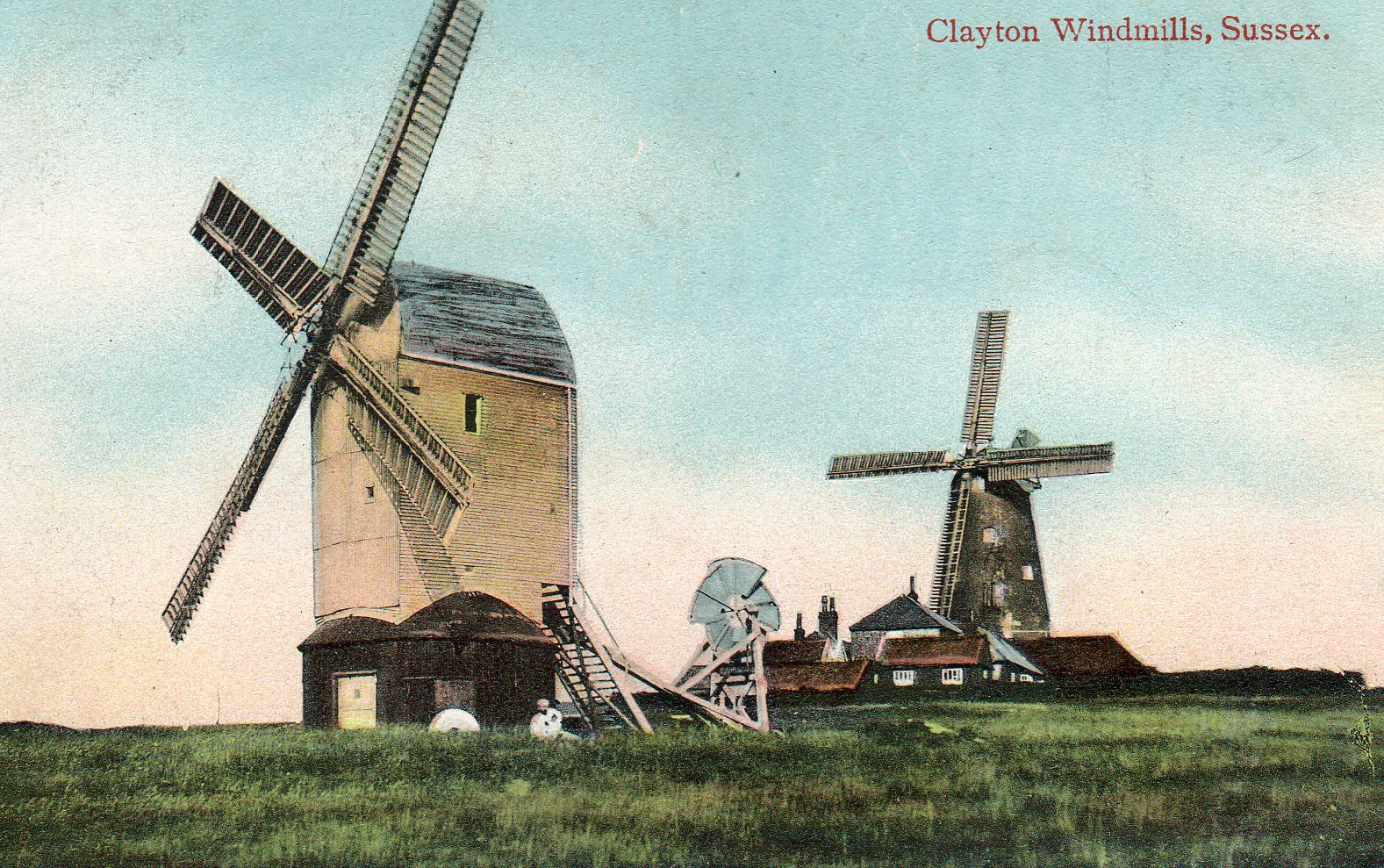
The mills at work

== Millers ==
- Edward Horam 1765–1787 (Duncton)
- John Geere 1809 (Duncton)
- Thomas Hicks 1810 (Duncton)
- John Hamlin 1816 (Duncton)
- James Mitchell 1838–1872 (Duncton, Jack, Jill)
- Joseph Hammond 1872–1882 (Jack, Jill)
- Charles Hammond 1872–1905 (Jack, Jill)
- Guy 1905–1907 (Jack, Jill)

References for above:-

== In popular culture ==
In summer 1973, Jack and Jill featured in the Universal Pictures film The Black Windmill. Actors in the film included Michael Caine, Janet Suzman, Donald Pleasence and Joss Ackland.

New sweeps were fitted to Jack for the film, at a cost of £3,000 and the exterior of the mill was repainted. The owner of Jack at the time of the film was Henry Longhurst, golf broadcaster and writer.

The windmills were featured in series 3 of the Channel 4 game show Treasure Hunt, first broadcast on 31 January 1985.

== See also ==
- Grade II* listed buildings in West Sussex
