= List of windmills in West Sussex =

Extant (red) and former (blue) windmills in West Sussex.
1 Angmering, 2 Arundel, 3 Barnham, 4 Boxgrove, 5 Clayton, 6 Durrington, 7 Earnley, 8 East Wittering, 9 Keymer, 10 Lowfield Heath, 11 Nutbourne, 12 Pagham, 13 Selsey, 14 Shipley, 15 Singleton, 16 Washington, 17 West Chiltington

A list of all windmills and windmill sites which lie in the current ceremonial county of West Sussex.

== Locations ==
=== A ===
Location	Name of mill and grid reference	Type	Maps	First mention or built	Last mention or demise	Photograph
Aldingbourne						
Aldingbourne						
Amberley	Old Mill, Amberley	Tower				
Angmering	Jerusalem Mill	Post		1780	Moved to Rustington, September 1848	
Angmering	Luck's Mill	Post		1813	Demolished July 1930	
Angmering	Highdown New Mill; Ecclesden Mill; TQ 082 044	Tower		1826		
Angmering	Preston Place Farm	Trestle with wind wheel		1853	1916	
Apuldram	Dell Quay Mill; Tipper's Mill	Post		1790	Demolished c. 1866. Roundhouse converted to residential use.	
Arundel	Cement Mill			1864	Standing c. 1915	
Arundel	Atfield's Mill	Post		c. 1824	Demolished December 1864.	
Arundel	South Marsh Mill; TQ 013 063	Tower		1830	Windmill World	
Ashington	Old Mill					
Ashurst		Post		1789	Blown down December 1929	

=== B ===
Location	Name of mill and grid reference	Type	Maps	First mention or built	Last mention or demise	Photograph
Barnham				1230	1683	
Barnham	Old Mill	Post		1762	Blown down 11 October 1827	
Barnham	Feaver's Mill; John Baker's Mill; SU 968 039	Tower		1829	Windmill World	
Billingshurst	Sprinks Mill; Six Bells Inn Mill				Burnt down 5 November 1852	
Billingshurst	Hammond's Mill; TQ 092 260	Smock		1825	Blown down 1906; Windmill World	
Birdham		Post	1724	1724	1724	
Birdham		Smock		1927	1939, gone by 1946	
Bognor Regis	Black Mill	Tower			Standing c. 1899	
Bolney		Smock		18th century	19th century	
Bosham	Old Mill					
Boxgrove	Halnaker Mill; SU 920 097	Tower		1740s	Windmill World	
Bramber				1778	1779	
Burgess Hill		Post				

=== C ===
Location	Name of mill and grid reference	Type	Maps	First mention or built	Last mention or demise	Photograph
Chichester	St James's Mill					
Chichester	Broyle Mill					
Chichester	Broyle Mill (2nd mill)					
Chichester	Portfield Mill					
Chidham	Old Mill	Post				
Clayton	Duncton Mill; TQ 304 135	Post		1765	Demolished 1866; Windmill World	
Clayton	Jill; TQ 304 134	Post		1852	Windmill World	
Clayton	Jack; TQ 304 135	Tower		1866	Windmill World	
Climping		Ilsham Manor		1338	1338	
Climping		Cudlow Manor		1338	1338	
Climping		Atherington Manor; Totsham Mill		1378	1485	
Climping	Clymping Mill	Post		1780	Replaced by smock mill, 1799	
Climping	Clymping Mill; TQ 015 013	Smock		1799	Demolished 1963; Windmill World	
Coldwaltham	Watersfield Common	Éolienne Bollée				
Coldwaltham	Watersfield Mill	Smock				
Compton	Old Mill		1724	1724	1724	
Cowfold	Monastery	Éolienne Bollée		1885		
Cowfold		Éolienne Bollée		1885	Collapsed 1960s	
Cuckfield	Beech Farm Mill	Smock		1873	Demolished 1922	
Cuckfield	Whiteman's Green Mill; Whiteman's Cross Mill	Post			Demolished c. 1877	
Cuckfield	Kennard's Mill					

=== D – F ===
Location	Name of mill and grid reference	Type	Maps	First mention or built	Last mention or demise	Photograph
Durrington	High Salvington Mill		1724	1615	1724	
Durrington	High Salvington Mill; TQ 123 067	Post		c. 1750	Windmill World	
Durrington	Glynde windpump TQ 123 067	Hollow Post		2008		
Earnley	Somerley Mill; SZ 817 984	Smock		1803	Windmill World	
East Wittering	East Wittering Mill; SZ 797 973	Tower		1810		
Fishbourne		Post		c. 1854	Demolished 1898	
Felpham	Black Mill	Post		1760	Demolished December 1902	
Felpham	White Mill	Smock		1801	Demolished 1879	
Ferring	John Olliver's Mill	Post		1750	Blown down c. 1823	
Findon	Church Hill Mill	Post		1783	1794	
Findon	Old Mill	Post		1823	1891	
Findon	Muntham	Vertical axis mill		1794	1795	
Fontwell	White Mill					

=== G – H ===
Location	Name of mill and grid reference	Type	Maps	First mention or built	Last mention or demise	Photograph
Goring-by-Sea	Goring Mill		1724	1724	1724 – Actually 'Heene Mill' as the Budgeon Map of 1724 shows it east of the Hundred boundary.	
Harting			1724	1724	1724	
Haywards Heath	Church Field Mill					
Henfield	Old Mill; Neptown Mill	Post		1724	Blown down 1908	
Henfield	New Mill; Barringer's Mill	Post		1844	Burnt 1954	
Highbrook	Hammingden Mill	Smock		1830	Moved to Newhaven 1844	
Horsham	Wimblehurst Mill					
Horsham	Champion's Mill					
Horsham	Warnham Mill					
Horsham	Compton Mill					
Horsham	Roffey Mill					
Horsham	Southwater Mill; Cripplegate Mill	Smock		1810	Burnt down 1914	
Hunston	Kipson Bank Mill; TQ 858 008	Smock	1813	1801	Demolished 1919; Windmill World	

=== I – L ===
Location	Name of mill and grid reference	Type	Maps	First mention or built	Last mention or demise	Photograph
Ifield		Post		c. 1870	Demolished 1899	
Keymer	Oldland Mill; TQ 321 162	Post		1703	Windmill World	
Kirdford	Kirdford Mill	Post		1770s	Moved to Coolham c. 1800	
Lancing	Hoe Court			1276	1277	
Lancing	Lancing Down Mill	Post		16th century	1592	
Lancing	Lancing Down Mill	Post		1750	Demolished 1905	
Lindfield						
Littlehampton	Cudlow Mill; Arun Mill	Post			Moved to Fishbourne c 1854	
Littlehampton	Arun Mill	Tower				
Littleworth	Jolesfield Mill				used for corn. In use 1890s but disused by 1911 as per contemporary Ordnance Survey maps. Windmill PH nearby – still on main road through village	
Littlehampton	Toddington Mill					
Lowfield Heath	Lowfield Heath Mill; TQ 270 398	Post	1762; 1777; 1789; 1823^{*}	1762	Dismantled June 1987, re-erected at Charlwood, Surrey 1989	
Lyminster	Brookfield Mill					
Lyminster	Toddington Mill					

=== N – P ===
Location	Name of mill and grid reference	Type	Maps	First mention or built	Last mention or demise	Photograph
Northchapel	Old Mill					
North Stoke		Post				
Nutbourne	Nutbourne Mill; TQ 078 189	Tower		1854	Windmill World	
Nutbourne						
Oving			1291	1291		
Oving	Old Mill				Burnt down 19th century	
Pagham		Post				
Pagham	Nyetimber Mill; SZ 892 988	Tower		1840s	Windmill World	
Petworth	Old Mill					
Plaistow	Pullen's Mill					
Pulborough	Heath Mill					
Pulborough	Pulborough Mill					
Pulborough	Waterfield Mill	Post			Demolished 1869	

=== R – S ===
Location	Name of mill and grid reference	Type	Maps	First mention or built	Last mention or demise	Photograph
Rudgwick	Rudgwick Mill					
Rudgwick	Honey Lane Mill					
Rusper	Old Mill	Smock				
Rustington	Bridge Mill		Post	1855	1894	
Rustington	Sea Field Mill	Post		1805	Demolished 1910	
Rustington	Rustington Mill			1848	Moved to Fishbourne, October 1857	
Selham	Moorland Farm Mill					
Selsey		Post		1783	Replaced by tower mill, c. 1827	
Selsey	Medmerry Mill; SZ 844 934	Tower		c. 1827	Windmill World	
Shipley	Honeypoles Mill					
Shipley	King's Mill; TQ 143 218	Smock		1879	Windmill World	
Shipley	Coolham Mill	Post				
Shoreham	Good Friday Mill	Post		c. 1764	Burnt down 1899	
Shoreham	Old Mill					
Shoreham	Town Mill	Post				
Shoreham	Shripney Mill					
Singleton	Westham windpump SU 874 128	Hollow post		1975	Windmill World	
Slindon	Slindon Mill	Post				
Sompting	pumping mill					
Southwick	Southwick Mill	Smock				
Southwick	Cement Mill					
Steyning		Post				
Storrington	Botting's Mill	Post				
Storrington	Kithurst Mill; Black Mill; Box Mill	Post		1750	Demolished 1923	
Storrington	Storrington Mill	Post		1820		
Sullington	Sullington Mill; Warren Mill; Crowhurst's Mill	Post		1800	Burnt down 9 August 1911, windshaft remains on site	
Sullington		Post				

=== T – W ===
Location	Name of mill and grid reference	Type	Maps	First mention or built	Last mention or demise	Photograph
Twineham	Hooker's mill	Hollow post		c. 1865	Demolished 1900	
Upmarden	Haslet Mill			1581	1593	
Upmarden	Upmarden Mill; Apple Down Mill					
Upper Beeding				1384	1700	
Upper Beeding		Post		1779	1875, gone by 1896	
Walberton	Avisford Hill Mill	Post				
Walberton	Short's Mill	Smock		c. 1820	Demolished c. 1896	
Washington	Rock Mill; TQ 128 137	Smock		1823	Windmill World	
West Ashling (Funtington)	Hackett's Mill	Hollow Post		c. 1868	Demolished 1955	
West Chiltington	Meeten's Mill; TQ 085 181	Smock		1838	Windmill World	
West Dean	Binderton Rook Mill; Rook Bindert's Mill		1724	1724	1724	
West Dean		Two Titt iron wind engines		1898		
West Grinstead	Littleworth Mill; Jolesfield Mill	Smock	1813	1788	Demolished 1959, tower re-erected at Gatwick Manor, Crawley. Intended reconstruction but never completed as a windmill. Surviving machinery now exhibited at Lowfield Heath Mill.	
West Hoathly	Selsfield Common Mill	Smock				
Wisborough Green	Amblehurst Mill					
Wisborough Green	Champion's Mill	Smock		1820	Demolished 1915	
Worth	Effingham Mill					
Worth	Crawley Down Mill					
Worthing	Heene			1279	1279	
Worthing	Heene Mill			1650	1750s	
Worthing	Heene Mill	Post		1825	Demolished June 1903	
Worthing	Cross Street Mill; Isted's Mill; Teville Mill	Post		1807	Moved to new site (Sea Mill) 1881	
Worthing	Sea Mill	Post		1881		
Worthing	East Mill; Navarino North Mill; Hide's Mill	Smock	1813	1813	Demolished 1902	
Worthing	Navarino South Mill	Tower		c. 1829	Demolished c. 1910	
Worthing	Cissbury Mill; Ballard's Mill; Offington Mill; Broadwater Mill	Post		1780	Demolished c. 1914	
Worthing	pumping mill					

== Sources ==
Unless stated otherwise, the source for all entries is Brunnarius, Martin (1979). The Windmills of Sussex. Chichester: Philimore. ISBN 0-85033-345-8. or Hemming, Peter (1936). Windmills in Sussex. London: C W Daniel. Online version

== Maps ==
- 1596 Robert Morden
- 1724 Richard Budgen
- 1762 John Rocque
- 1777 Andrews & Drury
- 1789 Lindley & Crossley
- 1795 Gardner & Gream
- 1813 Ordnance Survey
- 1823 C & G Greenwood
- 1823^{*} Bryant
