= List of museums in West Sussex =

This list of museums in West Sussex, England contains museums which are defined for this context as institutions (including nonprofit organizations, government entities, and private businesses) that collect and care for objects of cultural, artistic, scientific, or historical interest and make their collections or related exhibits available for public viewing. Also included are non-profit art galleries and university art galleries. Museums that exist only in cyberspace (i.e., virtual museums) are not included.

| Name | Image | Town/City | Region | Type | Summary |
|---|---|---|---|---|---|
| Amberley Museum & Heritage Centre | | Amberley | Horsham | Open-air | 36-acre (150,000 m^{2}) site dedicated to industry, communications and transport, includes Amberley Museum Railway |
| Arundel Castle | | Arundel | Arun | Historic house | Restored medieval castle with paintings and furniture, tapestries and stained glass, china and clocks, sculpture and carving, heraldry and armour in room settings |
| Arundel Museum | | Arundel | Arun | Local | Local and maritime history |
| Bignor Roman Villa | | Bignor | Chichester | Archaeology | Remains of a Roman home and farm with mosaic floors |
| Bognor Regis Museum | | Bognor Regis | Arun | Multiple | local history, fossils, shop displays including a toy shop, ironmongers, cobbler and wireless shop with historic radio and television equipment, Victorian kitchen, railway memorabilia |
| Burgess Hill Museum | | Burgess Hill | Mid Sussex | Local | local history, culture |
| Cass Sculpture Foundation | | Goodwood | Chichester | Art | Outdoor sculpture park |
| Clayton Windmills | | Clayton | Mid Sussex | Mill | 19th century post and tower windmills |
| Coultershaw Beam Pump | | Petworth | Chichester | Technology | 18th century waterwheel-driven three-throw beam pump |
| Cowdray House | | Midhurst | Chichester | Historic house | Tours of the ruins of a 16th-century Tudor house partially destroyed by fire in 1793 |
| Crawley Museum Centre | | Crawley | Crawley | Local | local history, culture, archaeology |
| Cuckfield Museum | | Cuckfield | Mid Sussex | Local | local history, culture |
| East Grinstead Museum | | East Grinstead | Mid Sussex | Local | local history, culture |
| Fishbourne Roman Palace | | Fishbourne | Chichester | Archaeology | Excavated Roman palace with mosaic floor, reconstructed garden |
| Goodwood House | | Goodwood | Chichester | Historic house | Jacobean country house with state rooms, art collection |
| Hammerwood Park | | East Grinstead | Mid Sussex | Historic house | 1972 country house designed by Benjamin Latrobe |
| Henfield Museum | | Henfield | Horsham | Local | local history, culture |
| High Salvington Windmill | | High Salvington | Worthing | Mill | 18th century post windmill |
| Horsham Museum | | Horsham | Horsham | Multiple | Local history, culture, decorative arts, crafts, photography, reconstructed blacksmith and wheelwright's shops, Percy Bysshe Shelley, costumes, toys |
| Ifield Water Mill | | Crawley | Crawley | Mill | 19th century weaterboarded watermill |
| Littlehampton Museum | | Littlehampton | Arun | Local | local and maritime history, art exhibits |
| Marlipins Museum | | Shoreham-by-Sea | Adur | Local | Local and maritime history |
| Nymans | | Handcross | Mid Sussex | Historic house | Late 19th century Gothic-style house destroyed by fire in 1947. |
| Newtimber Place | | Newtimber | Mid Sussex | Historic house | 15th century moated house open by guided tour appointment |
| The Novium | | Chichester | Chichester | Local | Local history, geology, archaeology |
| Oldland Mill | | Keymer | Mid Sussex | Mill | 18th century post windmills |
| Otter Gallery | | Chichester | Chichester | Art | contemporary art gallery of the University of Chichester |
| Oxmarket Centre of Arts | | Chichester | Chichester | Art | |
| Pallant House Gallery | | Chichester | Chichester | Art | Collection focus is modern British art |
| Parham Park | | Cootham | Horsham | Historic house | Elizabethan house and gardens |
| Petworth Cottage Museum | | Petworth | Chichester | Historic house | Restored 1910 period worker's cottage for a seamstress at Petworth House |
| Petworth House | | Petworth | Chichester | Historic house | Operated by the National Trust, late 17th-century mansion with important collection of paintings and sculptures, 700 acre (2.8 km^{2}) landscaped park designed by Capability Brown |
| The Priest House, West Hoathly | | West Hoathly | Mid Sussex | Historic house | early 15th century timber-framed hall-house with furnished rooms displaying 17th & 18th century country furniture, ironwork, embroidery and domestic artifacts |
| Sackville College | | East Grinstead | Mid Sussex | Historic site | Jacobean almshouse with chapel and great hall, open for tours |
| Saint Hill Manor | | Saint Hill Green | Mid Sussex | Historic house | Head office for the Church of Scientology in the United Kingdom, 18th century house reflecting its different owners |
| Shoreham Airport Visitor Centre | | Shoreham-by-Sea | Adur | Aviation | Area aviation history and memorabilia, operates airport tours |
| St. Mary's House & Gardens | | Bramber | Horsham | Historic house | late 15th century timber-framed house on a site associated with the Knights Templar |
| Standen | | East Grinstead | Mid Sussex | Historic house | Operated by the National Trust, late 19th century Arts and Crafts house and gardens |
| Stansted House | | Stoughton | Chichester | Historic house | Edwardian country house and park |
| Steyning Museum | | Steyning | Horsham | Local | local history, culture |
| Storrington Museum | | Storrington | Horsham | Local | local history, culture |
| Tangmere Military Aviation Museum | | Tangmere | Chichester | Aviation | History of the former RAF Tangmere airfield, historic military aircraft, activities during the Battle of Britain |
| Uppark | | South Harting | Chichester | Historic house | Operated by the National Trust, restored 18th century Georgian house with period paintings, furniture and ceramics, Victorian servant's quarters, garden |
| Weald and Downland Open Air Museum | | Singleton | Chichester | Open-air | Features nearly 50 historic buildings dating from the thirteenth to nineteenth centuries, along with gardens, farm animals, walks and a lake |
| West Dean College | | West Dean | Chichester | Art | Exhibits of fine art, craft, weavings |
| Wings Museum | | Balcombe | Mid Sussex | Aviation | history of RAF Redhill in World War II, aero engines, propellers, artefacts, uniforms, aircraft parts, equipment, local history, Home Front items |
| Worthing Museum and Art Gallery | | Worthing | Worthing | Multiple | Local history, art, costumes, textiles, toys and dolls, archaeology, fine and decorative arts, coins |

== See also ==
- Category:Tourist attractions in West Sussex
