= Highdown =

Highdown may refer to:

- Highdown Gardens, a garden in Worthing, England
- Highdown Hill, a prominent hill in the South Downs, England
- Highdown New Mill, Angmering, a tower mill in Sussex, England
- Highdown School, an academy in Reading, Berkshire

== See also ==
- High Down (disambiguation)
