= Nore Folly =

Building in Slindon, West Sussex, England

- Slindon Folly
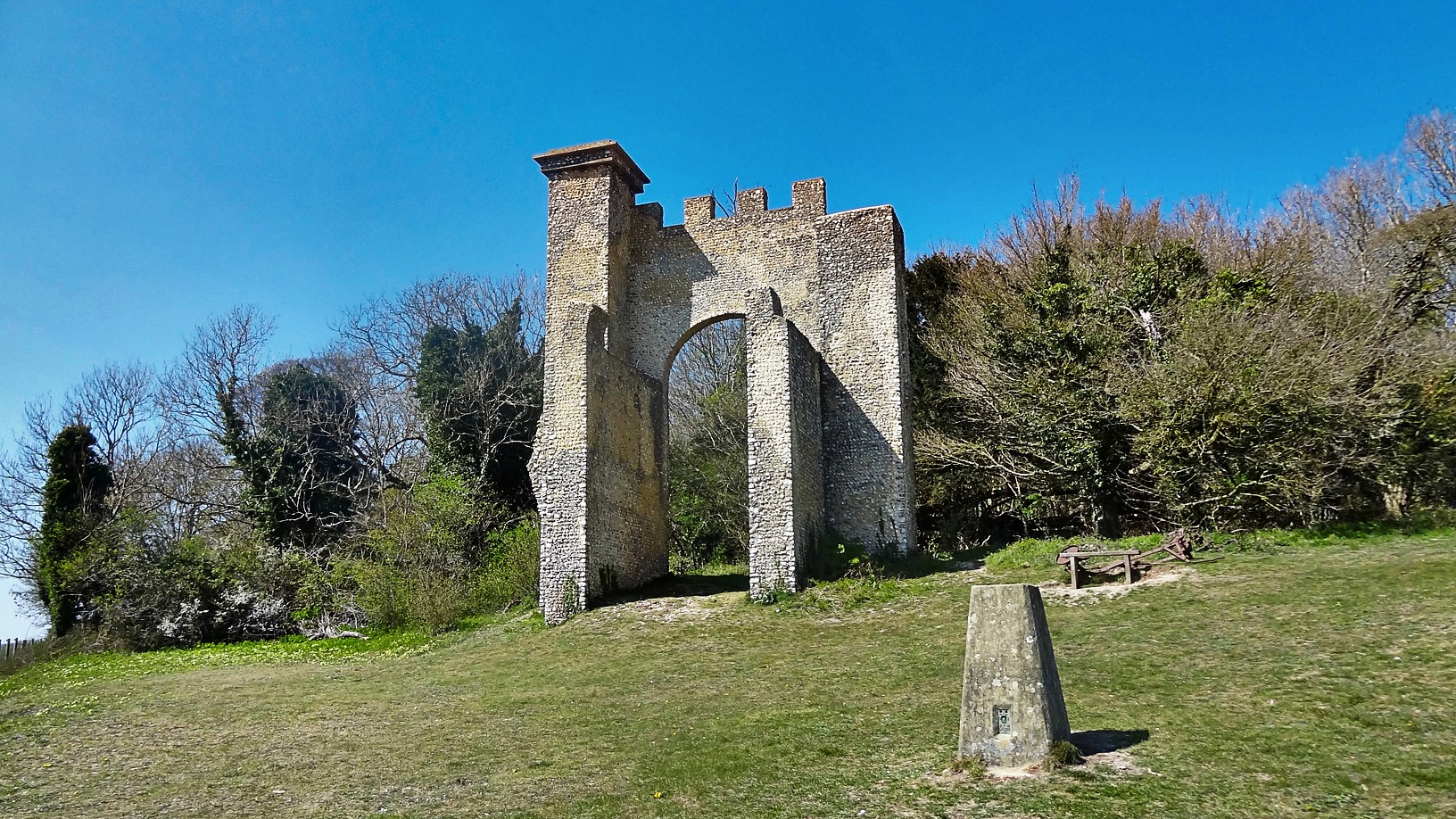
- The Folly and nearby trig point

- Location within West Sussex
- 50°52′39″N 0°38′38″W
- Location: Slindon, West Sussex

History
- Built: 1814

Listed Building – Grade II
- Official name: The Folly
- Designated: 20 September 1984
- Reference no.: 1027567

Nore Folly (also known as Slindon Folly) is a folly near the village of Slindon, West Sussex, United Kingdom. The stone construction resembles a gateway but is a decorative piece which leads to nowhere. It was built of flint in the 18th century by the Newburgh family, possibly because of the countess's liking for an Italian picture of a building.

The National Trust, which restored the folly in 1993, states that Nore Folly was "built in 1814 for the Countess of Newburgh’s picnic parties". At that time there was a small covered building attached, which has since been torn down. It was designated as a Grade II listed building in 1984.

A well-used, although somewhat steep, walking path leads up to Nore Folly, at which there is an outlook with a clear view over the countryside, including a view of Halnaker Windmill, a long section of the coastline, Portsmouth Spinnaker Tower, Chichester Cathedral, and Bognor Regis.

The folly featured on a first day cover designed by British First Day Covers Limited in 2006.
