= Halnaker =

Hamlet in West Sussex, England

Coordinates: 50.86508°N 0.71193°W

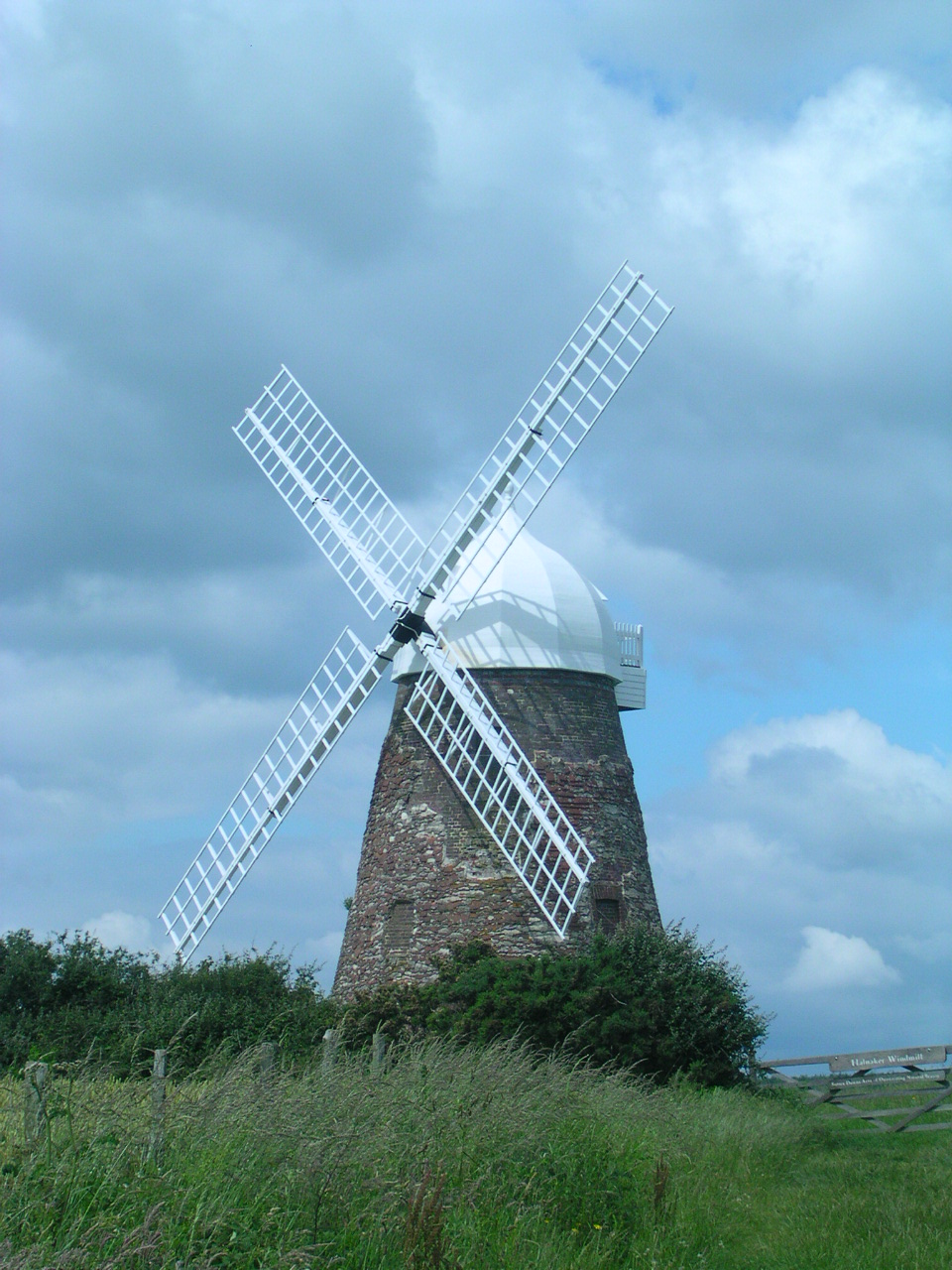
- Halnaker Windmill

- Location within West Sussex
- OS grid reference: SU907080
- Civil parish: Boxgrove
- District: Chichester
- Shire county: West Sussex
- Region: South East
- Country: England
- Sovereign state: United Kingdom
- Post town: Chichester
- Postcode district: PO18
- Police: Sussex
- Fire: West Sussex
- Ambulance: South East Coast
- UK Parliament: Chichester

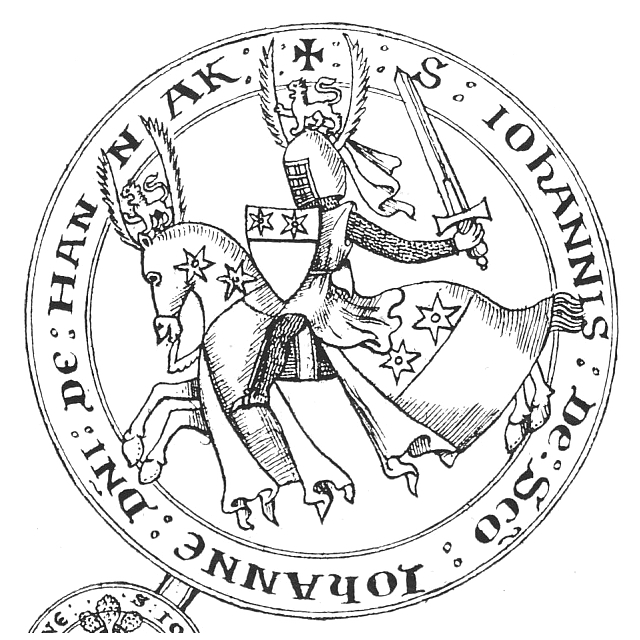
Seal of Baron St John of Halnaker, lord of the manor of Halnaker, appended to the Barons' Letter, 1301

Halnaker (/ˈhænəkər/ HAN-ə-kər) is a hamlet in the Chichester district of West Sussex, England. It lies on the A285 road 3.5 miles (5.6 km) north-east of Chichester, where it follows the line of the Roman road to London called Stane Street. There is a pub called The Anglesey Arms. Goodwood House is north-west of the village. North-east of the village Halnaker Windmill stands on 128 metre/420 feet high Halnaker Hill, a southern outpost of the South Downs. It is in the civil parish of Boxgrove.

== History ==
Halnaker is mentioned in the Domesday Book under the Hundred of Boxgrove, Sussex, as having 44 households in the lands belonging to Earl Roger. The book, which was written in 1086, said:

The same William holds Halnaker of the Earl. Alweard held it TRE and then as now it was assessed at nine hildes. There is land for five ploughs. In demesne, there are two ploughs and seventeen villans with twelve cottars with two ploughs. There are eight acres of meadow and woodland for 9 pigs. In Chichester are three burgesses paying 5 shillings. TRE it was worth four pounds now 100 shillings.

. TRE = Tempore Regis Edwardi, in the time of King Edward. The place was in medieval times also referred to as Halfnaked. Kelly's Directory of 1867 says that Boxgrove manor-house

...is said to have been built by Sir Thomas West, who married, early in the reign of Henry VIII, Elizabeth, the heiress of John Bonville, of Halnaker.

Edward VI came to the "pretty house" at "Halvenaker" at the end of July 1552 during a progress.
