= Crockerhill, West Sussex =

Hamlet in West Sussex, England

Coordinates: 50°51′30″N 0°41′12″W

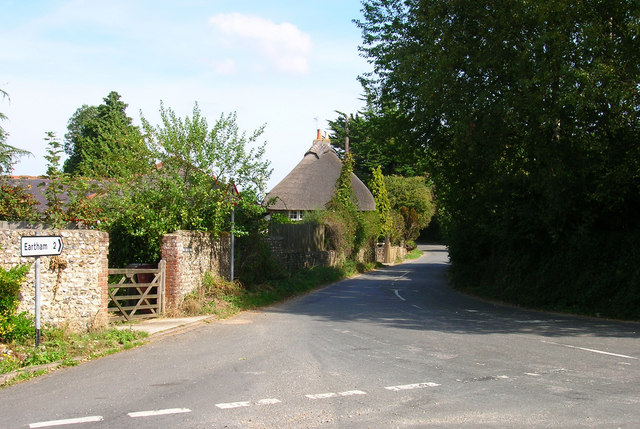
Crockerhill Cottage

Crockerhill is a hamlet on the A27 road between Tangmere and Fontwell in West Sussex, England. It has one public house, The Winterton Arms. At the 2011 Census the population of the hamlet was included in the civil parish of Boxgrove.
