= High Down =

High Down may refer to:

- High Down (HM Prison), prison in Surrey, England
- High Down (Isle of Wight), area of downland on Isle of Wight, England
- High Down Rocket Test Site preserved site, Isle of Wight, England

== See also ==
- Highdown (disambiguation)
