= John Baker's Mill, Barnham =

Windmill in Barnham, West Sussex, England

Barnham Windmill
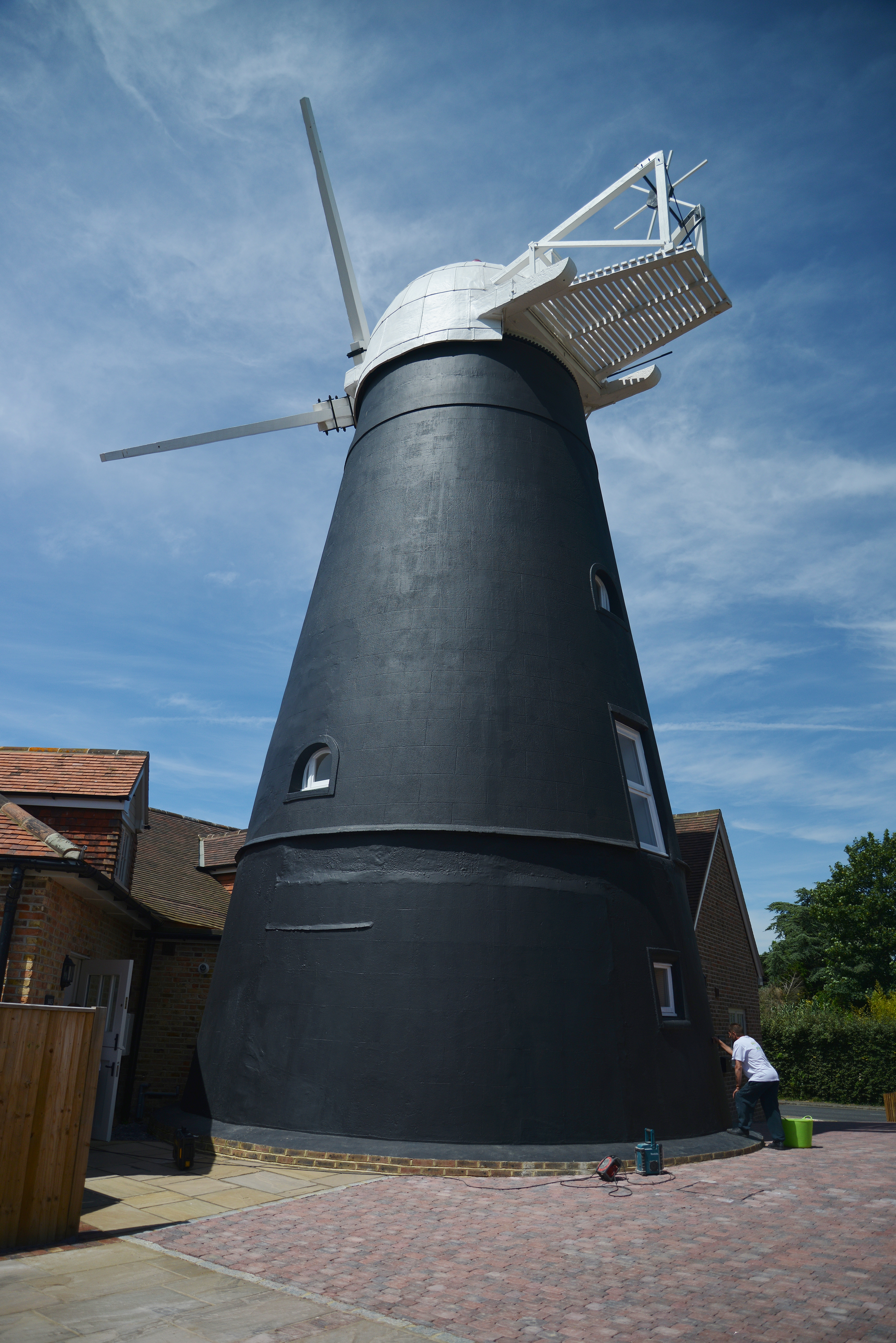
- The mill in 2015

Origin
- Mill name: John Baker's Mill
- Mill location: SU 968 039
- Coordinates: 50°49′37″N 0°37′37″W
- Operator(s): Private
- Year built: 1829

Information
- Purpose: Corn mill
- Type: Tower mill
- Storeys: Four storeys
- No. of sails: Four sails
- Type of sails: Patent sails
- Windshaft: Cast iron
- Winding: Fantail
- Fantail blades: Six blades
- No. of pairs of millstones: Three pairs

John Baker's Mill (or Barnham Windmill) is a grade II listed tower mill at Barnham, Sussex, England, which was under restoration and is now to be converted to residential use.

== History ==
John Baker's Mill was built in 1829. The mill was known as Feaver's Mill in the 1860s. In 1890, the mill tower was raised by 18 inches (460 mm) and completely refitted by J W Holloway, the Shoreham millwright. It was worked by wind until the early 1920s and by engine until 1963. The sails and fantail were removed in August 1958.

On 16 January 2008, Arun District Council gave Listed Building Consent for the windmill to be converted to a dwelling, despite strong opposition from the Society for the Protection of Ancient Buildings. In January 2014 the Windmill was purchased by Bolrush Developments Ltd who specialize in listed building development.

== Description ==
John Baker's Mill is a four-storey flint and stone tower mill with a stage at first floor level. When built, it had two common sails and two spring sails. These were replaced with four patent sails carried on a cast iron windshaft, in 1890. The mill is fitted with Holloway's screw brake. The cap is a beehive shape, winded by a fantail. The mill originally drove two pairs of millstones, and Holloway's added a third pair. Currently, the stocks for the sails are on the mill, but the sails have not been erected yet.

== Millers ==
- Henry Feaver 1866
- Maurice & John Baker 1882 -
- Percy Baker 1910 - 1916
- Len Baker 1916 - 1945
- Reginald Charles Reynolds (Len Bakers Cousin) 1945 - 1986 husband to Marjorie Reynolds

References for above:-
