= East Wittering Windmill =

Windmill in East Wittering, West Sussex, England

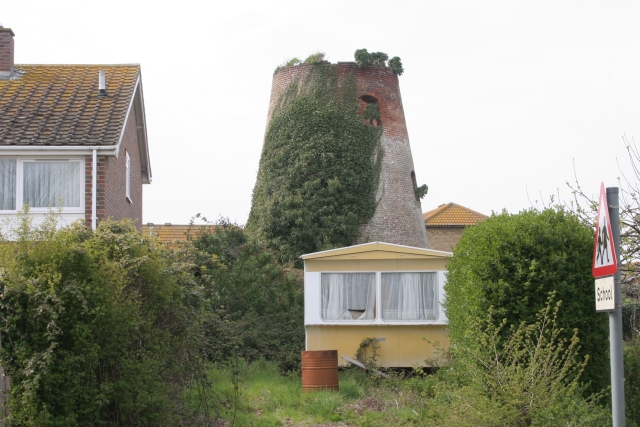
- The mill in 2005

Origin
- Mill name: East Wittering Mill
- Mill location: SZ 797 973
- Coordinates: 50°46′12″N 0°52′16″W
- Operator(s): Private
- Year built: c1810

Information
- Purpose: Corn mill
- Type: Tower mill
- Storeys: Four storeys
- No. of sails: Four sails
- Type of sails: Two Spring sails and two Common sails
- Winding: Fantail
- No. of pairs of millstones: Two pairs

East Wittering Windmill is a grade II listed tower mill at East Wittering, Sussex, England which is derelict.

== History ==
East Wittering Windmill was first mentioned in 1810. The mill was working by wind until 1895, and the sails were removed in 1896. The cap was blown off in 1931. The derelict tower retained some machinery in 1974, but was burnt out in May 1975, with the windshaft falling within the tower.

== Description ==
East Wittering Windmill is a four-storey cement rendered brick tower mill. It had two Spring sails and two Common sails. The beehive cap was winded by a fantail. The sails were set with the aid of a travelling stage. The mill drove two pairs of underdrift millstones. The derelict tower stands today.

== Millers ==
- Robert Woodman 1845
- William Stevens 1855
- T Souch 1866
- R H Sparkes 1870
- E Redman 1887
- Richard Stevens 1887 - 1895

References for above:-
