= Nutbourne Windmill =

Windmill in Pulborough, Horsham, England

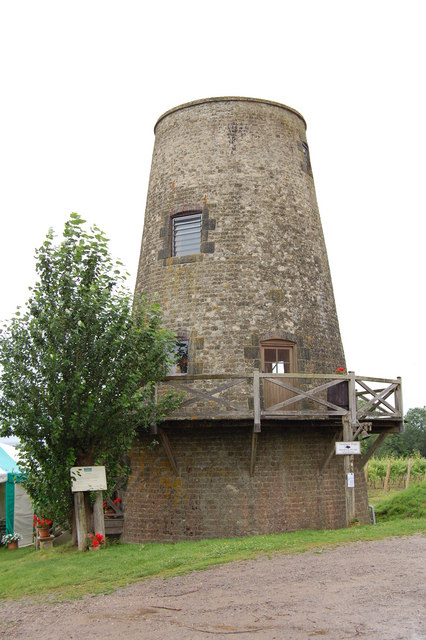
- The mill in 2007

Origin
- Mill name: Nutbourne Mill
- Mill location: TQ 07840 18863
- Coordinates: 50°57′33″N 0°27′57″W
- Operator(s): Nutbourne Vineyards
- Year built: 1854

Information
- Purpose: Corn mill
- Type: Tower mill
- Storeys: Five storeys
- No. of sails: Four sails
- Type of sails: Spring sails
- Winding: Fantail
- No. of pairs of millstones: Two pairs

Nutbourne Windmill is a tower mill at Nutbourne, Sussex, England which has been converted to retail use.

== History ==
Nutbourne Windmill was built in 1854. It had a short working life, stopping c.1894. The mill gradually became derelict, although the cap was still on the mill during the Second World War. At some point, the tail beam failed, and the windshaft was left hanging down vertically at the top of the tower, supported by the stocks alone. The mill tower now serves as a tasting room and shop for Nutbourne vineyards.

== Description ==
Nutbourne Windmill is a five-storey brick and stone tower mill with a stage at first floor level. The mill had a beehive cap, winded by a fantail and is thought to have had four Spring sails. The mill drove two pairs of underdrift millstones.

== Millers ==
- Messrs Reed and Stillwell 1890

References for above:-
