= Boxgrove =

Village and parish in West Sussex, England

Coordinates: 50.85928°N 0.71266°W

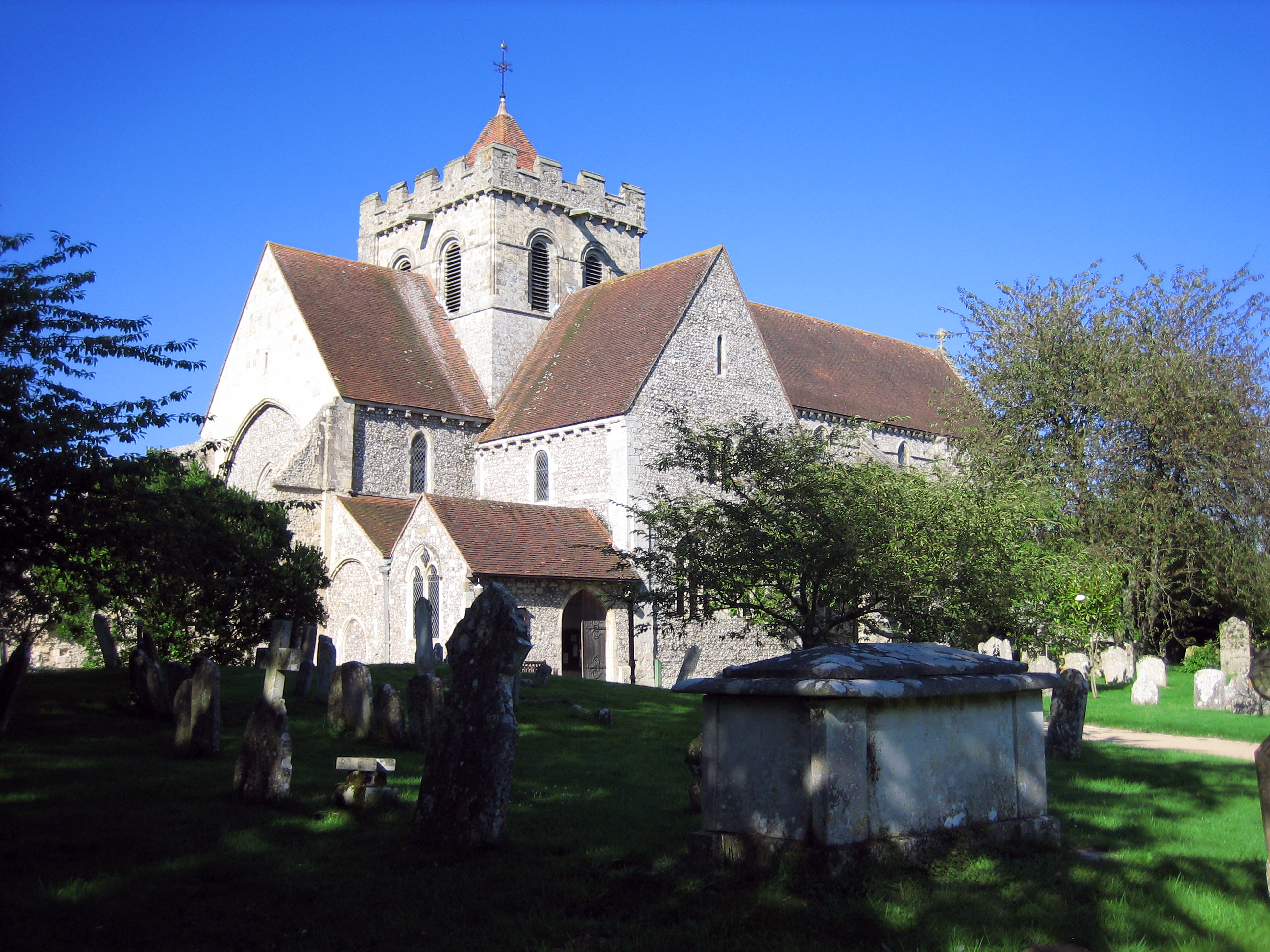
- Church of St Mary & St Blaise

- Location within West Sussex
- Area: 11.69 km^{2} (4.51 sq mi)
- Population: 957. 2011 Census
  - Density: 77/km^{2} (200/sq mi)
- OS grid reference: SU907074
  - London: 51 miles (82 km) NNE
- Civil parish: Boxgrove
- District: Chichester
- Shire county: West Sussex
- Region: South East
- Country: England
- Sovereign state: United Kingdom
- Post town: CHICHESTER
- Postcode district: PO18
- Dialling code: 01243
- Police: Sussex
- Fire: West Sussex
- Ambulance: South East Coast
- UK Parliament: Chichester

Boxgrove is a village, ecclesiastical parish and civil parish in the Chichester District of the English county of West Sussex, about 3.5 miles (5.6 km) north east of the city of Chichester. The village is just south of the A285 road which follows the line of the Roman road Stane Street.

The Anglican parish has an area of 1,169 hectares (2,890 acres). According to the 2001 census it had a population of 901 people living in 423 households of whom 397 were economically active. The 2011 Census indicated at population of 957. Included in the parish are the hamlets of Crockerhill, Strettington and Halnaker.

== Governance ==
An electoral ward in the same name exists. This ward stretches northwest to West Dean with a total population taken at the 2011 census of 2,235.

== History ==
=== Archaeology ===
Boxgrove is best known for the Lower Palaeolithic archaeological site discovered in a gravel quarry known as Eartham Pit located near the village but in Eartham Parish. Parts of the site complex were excavated between 1983 and 1996 by a team led by Mark Roberts of University College London.

Numerous Acheulean flint tools and remains of animals (some butchered) dating to around 500,000 years ago were found at the site. The area therefore was used by some of the earliest occupants of the British Isles. Remains of Homo heidelbergensis were found on the site in 1994, the only postcranial hominid bone to have been found in Northern Europe. Teeth from another individual were found two years later.

=== Hundred of Boxgrove ===
The ancient hundred of Boxgrove was listed in the Domesday Book (1086) as comprising nine settlements with 246 households. The settlements were Aldingbourne, Halnaker, Strettington, Runcton, East Hampnett, Merston, Westhampnett and Upwaltham, and Boxgrove village itself had 13 households.

=== Boxgrove Priory ===
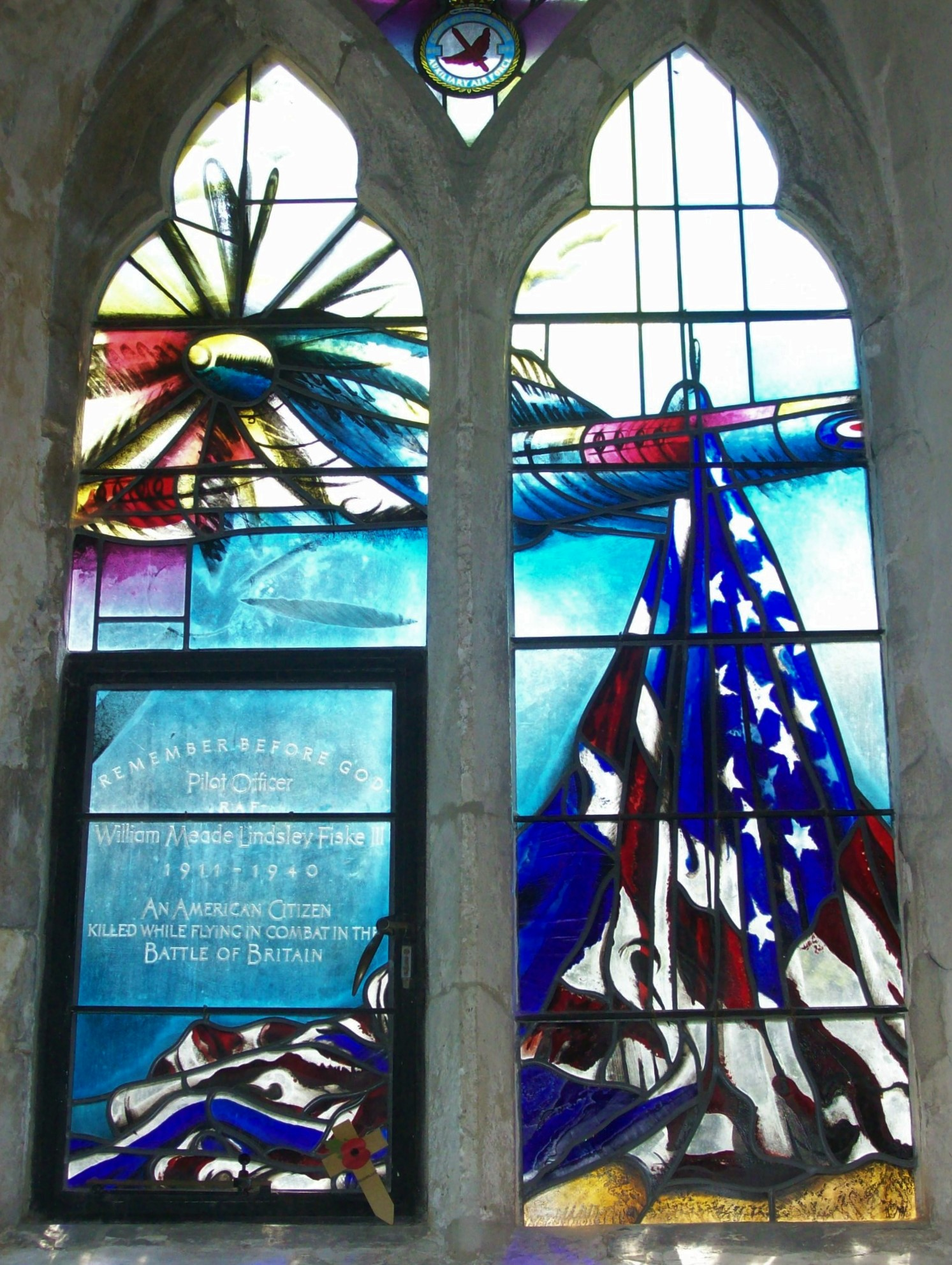
Fiske memorial window, Boxgrove

A Benedictine monastery was founded at Boxgrove by Robert de Haia (or de la Haye) early in the 12th century. The priory church remains as the Church of England parish church of St Mary and St Blaise, minus the original nave, and mostly dates from the 13th century.

=== Early cricket ===
Several parishioners of Boxgrove were prosecuted for playing cricket in the churchyard in 1622. There were three reasons for the prosecution: one was that it contravened a local bye-law; another reflected concern about church windows which may or may not have been broken; the third was the charge that "a little childe had like to have her braines beaten out with a cricket batt".

=== 19th century ===
The population of the parish in 1861 was 666, and the area 3,676 acres (1,488 ha), of which 1,700 were arable, and the remainder downland.
