= Pagham =

Village and parish in West Sussex, England

Coordinates: 50.77083°N 0.74479°W

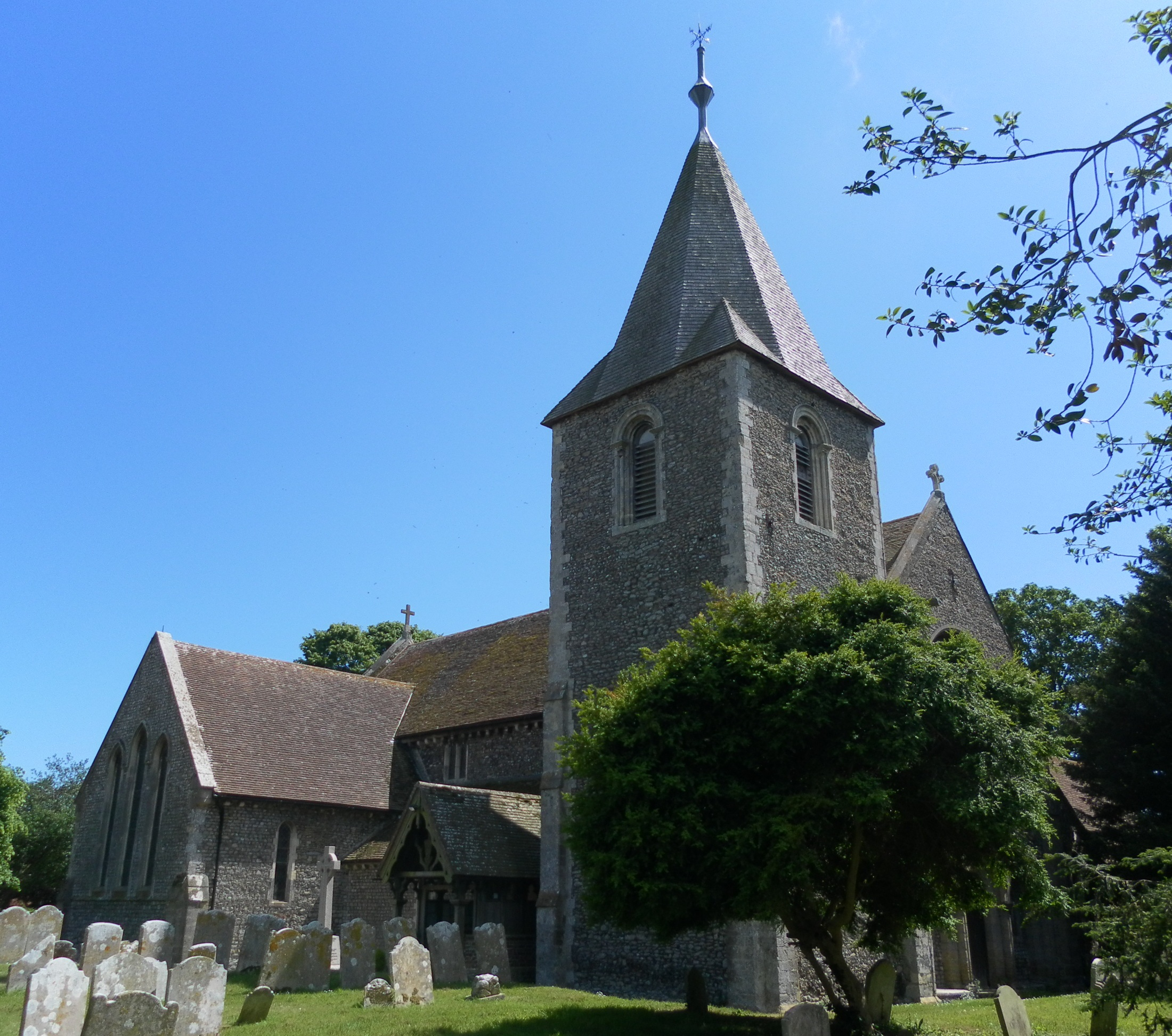
- St Thomas à Becket Church

- Location within West Sussex
- Area: 9.88 km^{2} (3.81 sq mi)
- Population: 5,941 (Civil Parish.2011)
  - Density: 601/km^{2} (1,560/sq mi)
- OS grid reference: SZ886975
  - London: 57 miles (92 km) NNE
- Civil parish: Pagham
- District: Arun
- Shire county: West Sussex
- Region: South East
- Country: England
- Sovereign state: United Kingdom
- Post town: BOGNOR REGIS
- Postcode district: PO21
- Dialling code: 01243
- Police: Sussex
- Fire: West Sussex
- Ambulance: South East Coast
- UK Parliament: Chichester
- Website: http://www.paghamcouncil.co.uk/

Pagham is a coastal village, Anglican parish and civil parish in the Arun district of West Sussex, England, with a population of around 6,100. It lies about two miles to the west of Bognor Regis.

== Demography ==
Pagham is part of the electoral ward called Pagham and Rose Green. The population of this ward at the 2011 census was 7,538.

The village can be divided into three contiguous neighbourhoods (merging seamlessly as one clustered village):

- Pagham Beach, coastal area, developed in the early 20th century,
- Pagham, the original 13th-century village
- Nyetimber, originally a separate village but has now been subsumed as part of a Local Authority rationalisation and the growth of the area.

== History ==
Pagham was a significant settlement at the time of the Domesday survey of 1086 with 154 households.

In 1861 the parish, which is in the Diocese of Chichester, extended to 4,376 acres (1,771 ha), with a population of 988.

== Landmarks ==
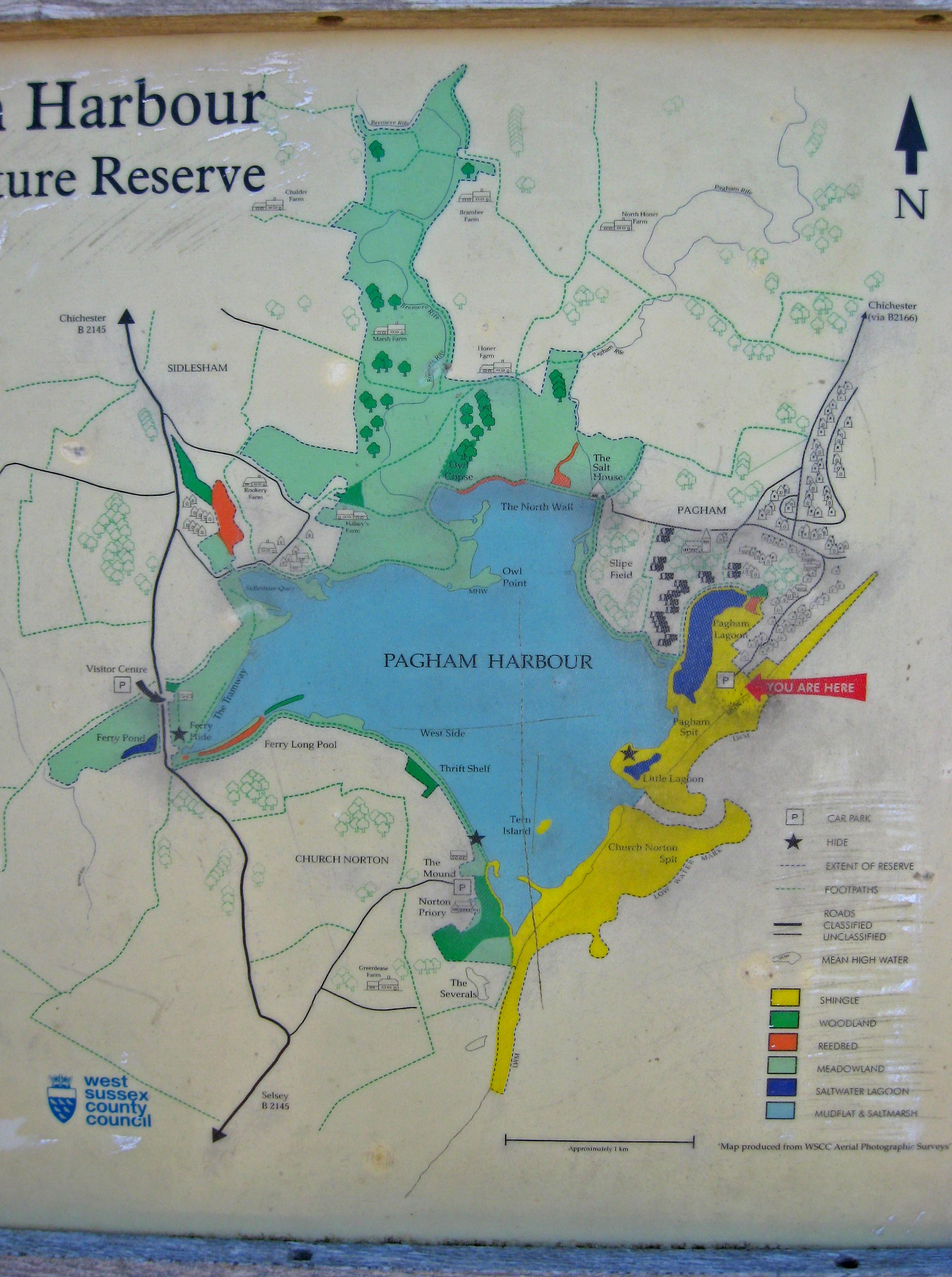
Map of Nature Reserve

The Site of Special Scientific Interest known as Pagham Harbour is to the southwest; almost one quarter of the area falls within the parish. The harbour and surrounding land is of national importance for both flora and fauna. The shingle spit is of geological interest.

A Phoenix breakwater, a concrete caisson that was intended to be part of a World War II Mulberry Harbour, is visible in the bay at low tides.

== Buildings and facilities ==
Many of the original Pagham Beach dwellings are bungalows constructed from old railway carriages - most of these have been later rebuilt using sturdier construction methods.

The parish church of St Thomas à Becket is a Grade I listed building; it contains three 1911 windows by the leading painter and designer Edward Arthur Fellowes Prynne, which were restored in 2011. Pagham is home to ale and beer pubs 'The Lamb', 'The Lion' and 'The Bear' as well as the 'Inglenook Hotel'.

== Sport and leisure ==
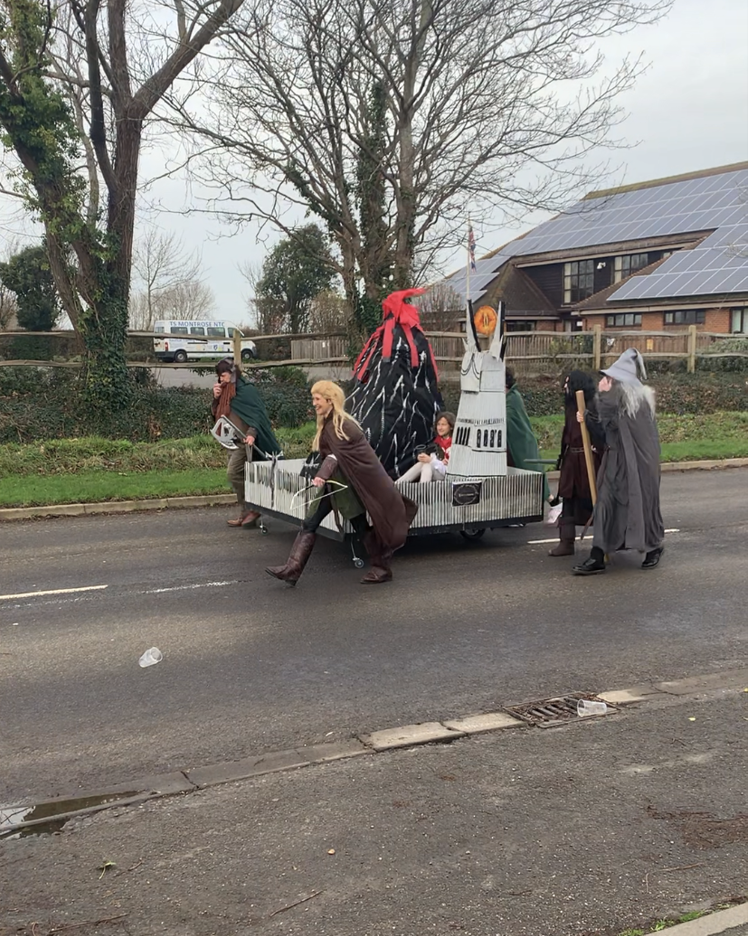
Colin Cooper (left) and entry in the 2023 Pagham Pram Race

Pagham has a Non-League football club Pagham F.C. who play at Nyetimber Lane. The village has a cricket team, who play at the cricket ground at Nyetimber Lane. Sussex County Cricket Club played two first-class matches there in the 1970s.

Pagham is the home of the Pagham Pram Race which is the oldest pram race in the world. The race is run on Boxing day every year at 11am whatever the weather. Thousands of people line the streets of Pagham to watch the wacky contestants navigate the 3 mile course, drinking 3 pints of beer en route. All the money raised by the Pram Race is distributed to local good causes. The most successful fancy dress racer is Colin Cooper, who has won 3 best fancy dress awards alongside his teammates.

== Notable people ==
James Byden, Joe Biden's paternal fourth great-grandfather was christened at the church of St Thomas à Becket in Pagham, on 15 November 1767. He was the son of Richard Byden, Biden's paternal fifth great-grandfather, and his wife Susan. The parish register notes that they were from Wymering where Richard appears to have been buried in 1808.

The motor racing drivers John Watson and Derek Bell lived in Pagham. Watson won five Formula One Grand Prix. Bell won the Le Mans 24 hour race five times.

== See also ==
- Crabb v Arun District Council [1975], a leading property and easements case which concerned a seller's assurance, in this case, of access from a public highway to neighbouring land in Pagham
- Nyetimber Mill
- Nyetimber (electoral division)
