= Somerley Mill, Earnley =

Windmill in Earnley, West Sussex, England

Earnley Windmill
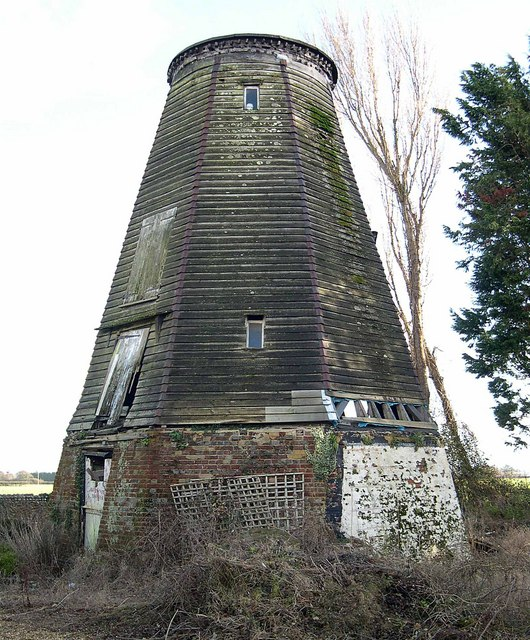
- The mill in 2005

Origin
- Mill name: Somerley Mill
- Mill location: SZ 817 983
- Coordinates: 50°46′44″N 0°50′35″W
- Operator(s): Private
- Year built: c1803

Information
- Purpose: Corn mill
- Type: Smock mill
- Storeys: Three-storey smock
- Base storeys: Single-storey base
- Smock sides: Eight sides
- No. of sails: Four sails
- Type of sails: Two Spring sails and two Common sails
- Winding: Fantail
- Auxiliary power: Engine
- No. of pairs of millstones: Two pairs, a third pair driven by engine

Somerley Mill is a grade II listed smock mill at Earnley, Sussex, England, which is under restoration.

== History ==
Somerley Mill, was first mentioned in 1803. It was raised in 1827, with a brick base being built under the mill. It was working until 1942. Currently, only the tower stands, the cap having been removed and a temporary roof placed over the top of the smock.

== Description ==
Somerley Mill is a three-storey smock mill on a single-storey brick base. It had a Beehive cap and was winded by a fantail. When working it had two Common sails and two Spring sails. The mill drove two pairs of overdrift millstones, with a third pair worked by engine.

== Millers ==
- Ellis - 1942

References for above:-
