= Nyetimber Mill =

Grade II listed mill in Sussex, England

Pagham Windmill
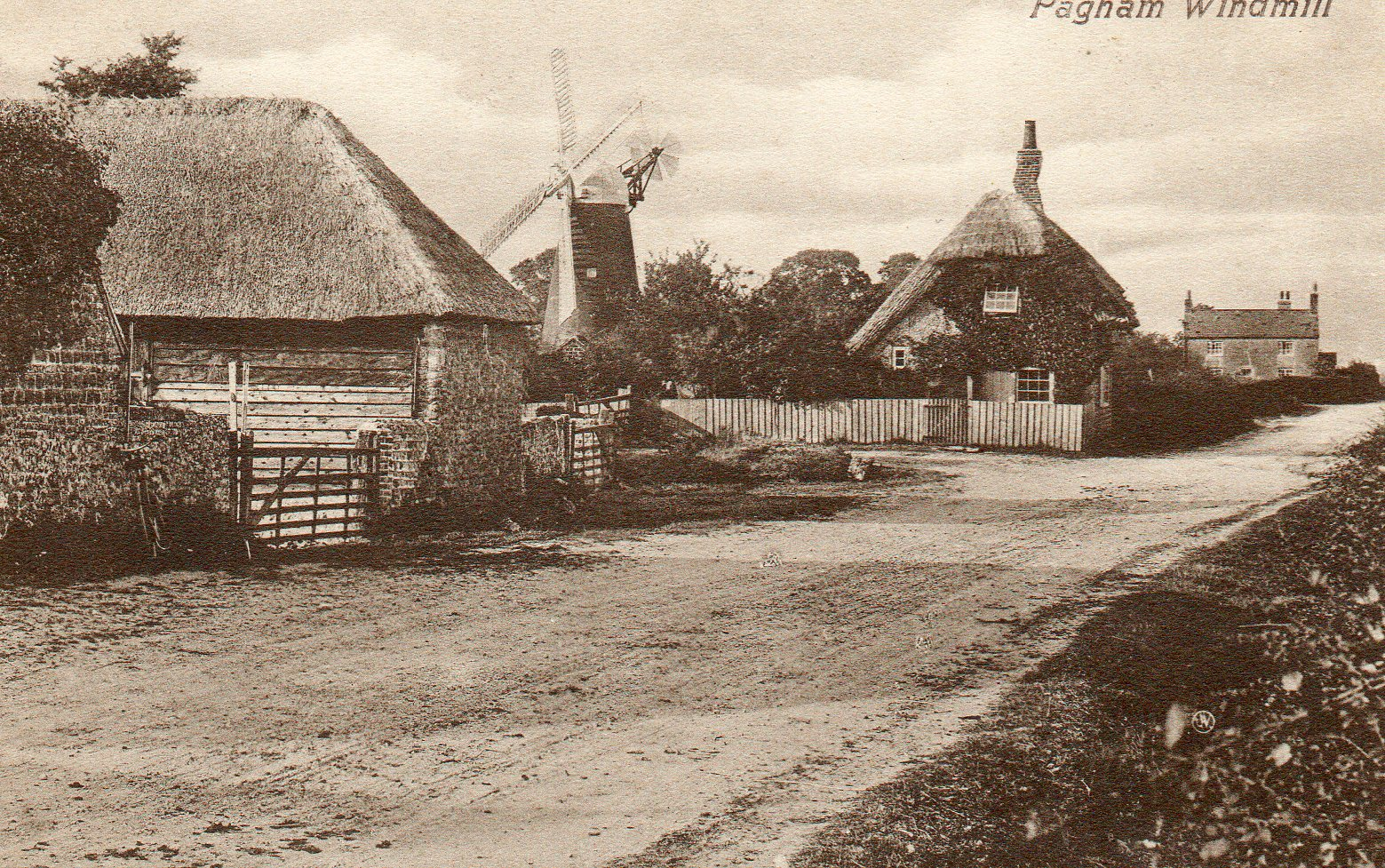
- The mill c1905

Origin
- Mill name: Nyetimber Mill
- Grid reference: SZ 892 988
- Coordinates: 50.782°N 0.736°W
- Operator(s): Private
- Year built: 1840s

Information
- Purpose: Corn mill
- Type: Tower mill
- Storeys: Four storeys
- No. of sails: Four sails
- Type of sails: Patent sails
- Winding: Fantail
- Fantail blades: Six pairs
- No. of pairs of millstones: Two pairs

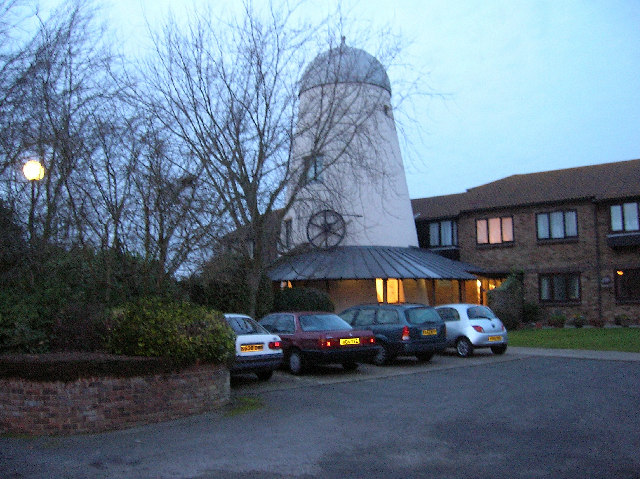
The mill in 2005

Nyetimber Mill is a grade II listed tower mill at Pagham, Sussex, England which has been converted to residential use.

== History ==
Nyetimber Mill was built in the early 1840s and was working until tailwinded in 1915. The sails were on the mill until they were struck by lightning in 1927. The mill became derelict and was burnt out in 1962, leaving the windshaft perched above the ivy covered tower. The mill was converted to a house by 2005.

== Description ==
Nyetimber Mill is a four-storey brick tower mill with an ogee cap. It had four Patent sails and was winded by a fantail. The mill drove two pairs of millstones. An external pulley enabled the mill to be worked by an engine. This has been retained in the converted mill.

== Millers ==
- William Adams 1840s - 1905
- W Prior - 1915

References for above:-
