= Medmerry Mill, Selsey =

Windmill in Selsey, West Sussex, England

Selsey Windmill
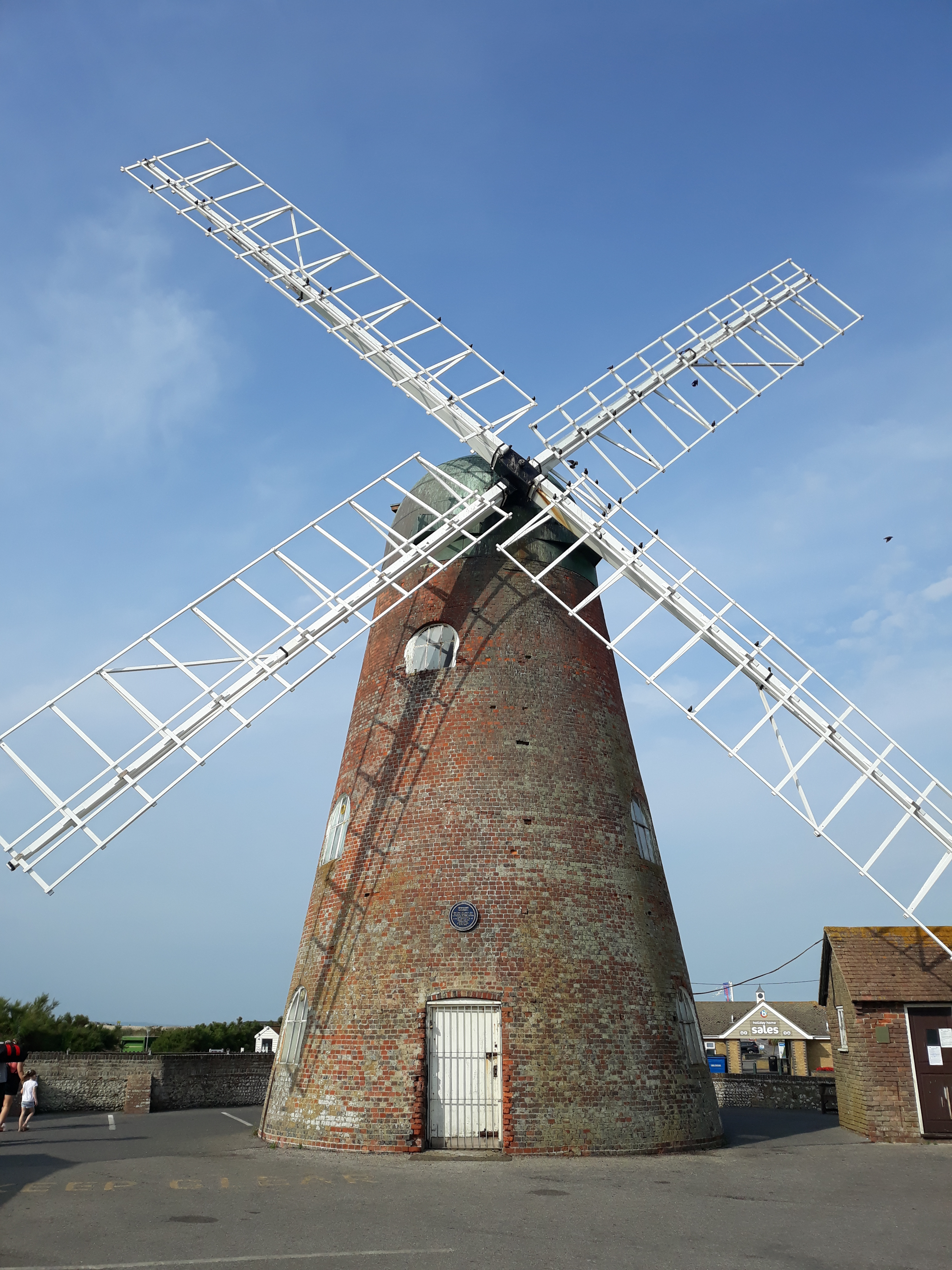
- The mill in 2020

Origin
- Mill name: Medmerry Mill
- Mill location: SZ 844 934
- Coordinates: 50°44′04″N 0°48′19″W
- Operator(s): Private
- Year built: c1827

Information
- Purpose: Corn mill
- Type: Tower mill
- Storeys: Four storeys
- No. of sails: Four sails
- Type of sails: Patent sails
- Windshaft: Cast iron
- Winding: Fantail (missing)
- No. of pairs of millstones: Two pairs

Medmerry Mill is a grade II listed tower mill at Selsey, Sussex, England, that has been restored and is used as a shop.

== History ==
Medmerry Mill was built circa 1827, replacing an earlier post mill and was working by wind until 1890. After falling into disrepair, the mill was refitted by Holloway of Shoreham in 1907–08. The mill was working until the early 1920s. The mill was derelict by 1928, with all four sails badly damaged. The fanstage was removed in 1960 during the restoration of the mill. In 1987, the mill was badly damaged, but the sails were later restored.

== Description ==
Medmerry Mill was built as a five-storey mill, driving two pairs of millstones. Holloway's completely refitted the mill in 1908, resulting in a four-storey brick tower mill with a domed cap which was winded by a fantail. It has four Patent sails carried on a cast iron Windshaft. The Brake Wheel is iron.

== Millers ==
- William Reeves 1783 (post mill)
- H R Arnell 1858 - 1878
- Sampson Copstake
- F W Sharpe 1882 - 1890
- Farne and Co. 1905 - 1920s

References for above:-
