= Meeten's Mill, West Chiltington =

Smock mill in West Chiltington, Sussex, England

West Chiltington Windmill
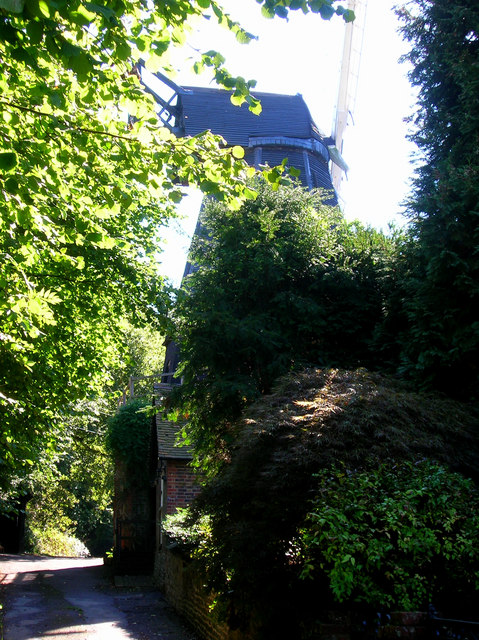
- The mill in 2006

Origin
- Mill name: Meeten's Mill
- Mill location: TQ 085 181
- Coordinates: 50°57′07″N 0°27′25″W
- Operator(s): Private
- Year built: 1838

Information
- Purpose: Corn mill
- Type: Smock mill
- Storeys: Two-storey smock
- Base storeys: Two-storey base
- Smock sides: Eight sides
- No. of sails: Four
- Type of sails: Spring sails
- Winding: Fantail
- No. of pairs of millstones: Three pairs

Meeten's Mill is a grade II listed smock mill at West Chiltington, Sussex, England, which has been converted to residential use.

== History ==
Meeten's Mill was originally built at Monkmead, and moved to West Chiltington in 1838. The mill first appeared on the West Chiltington tithe map of 1840. The mill was refitted by William Cooper, the Henfield millwright in 1865. It was working until 1922, when it was stripped of machinery and house converted. The millstones went to a watermill at Coolham.

== Description ==
Rock Mill is a two-storey smock mill on a two-storey stone base, with a stage at first-floor level. She had four Spring sails. The cap is in the Kentish style, winded by a fantail. The mill drove three pairs of millstones. The mill only has two sails and the fantail is missing. Various extensions have been made to the smock tower.

== Millers ==
- Hammond 1840 - 1844
- Willmer 1845 -
- Meeten 1898 - 1918

References for above:
