= South Marsh Mill, Arundel =

Windmill in Arundel, West Sussex, England

Arundel Windmill
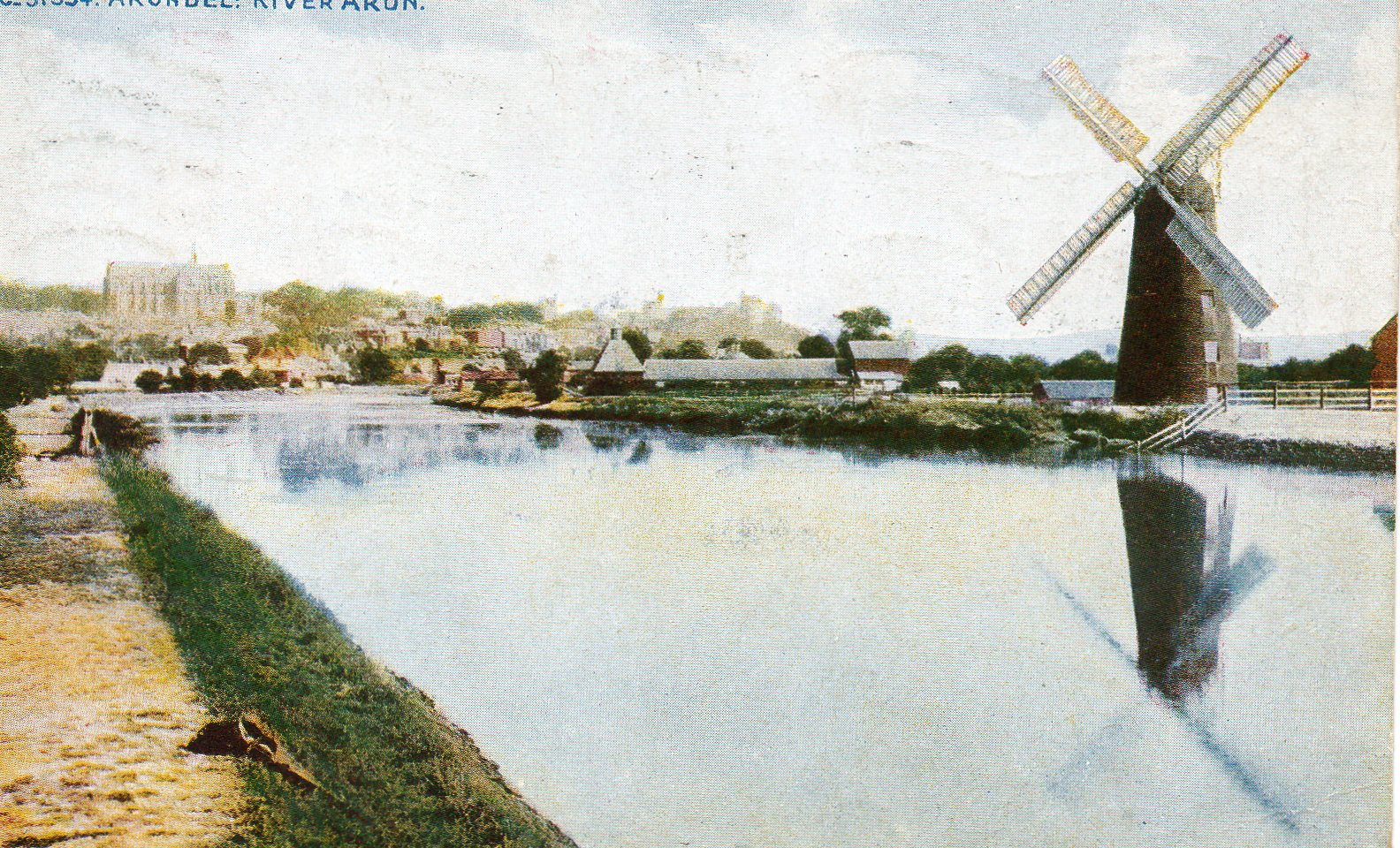
- The mill c1920

Origin
- Mill name: South Marsh Mill
- Mill location: TQ 013 063
- Coordinates: 50°50′49″N 0°33′43″W
- Operator(s): Private
- Year built: 1830

Information
- Purpose: Corn mill
- Type: Tower mill
- Storeys: Five storeys
- No. of sails: Four sails
- Type of sails: Patent sails
- Windshaft: Cast iron
- Winding: Fantail
- Auxiliary power: Engine

South Marsh Mill is a grade II listed tower mill at Arundel, Sussex, England which has been converted to residential use.

== History ==
South Marsh Mill was built in 1830. It was working by wind until 1915, when the windshaft snapped in a gale, but was worked by engine until 1922. The machinery was removed c.1941.

== Description ==
South Marsh Mill is a five-storey tower mill. It had four Patent sails carried on a cast iron windshaft. The cap was a beehive shape, winded by a fantail. The mill drove three pairs of millstones. The cap now carried is a hexagonal shape. The fantail is missing. Various extensions have been made to the tower.

== Millers ==
- Messrs Dendy & Pellet 1830 - 1840
- Henry Bartlett 1840 -
- William Watkins 1840 -

References for above:-
