= Halnaker Windmill =

Tower mill near Chichester, England

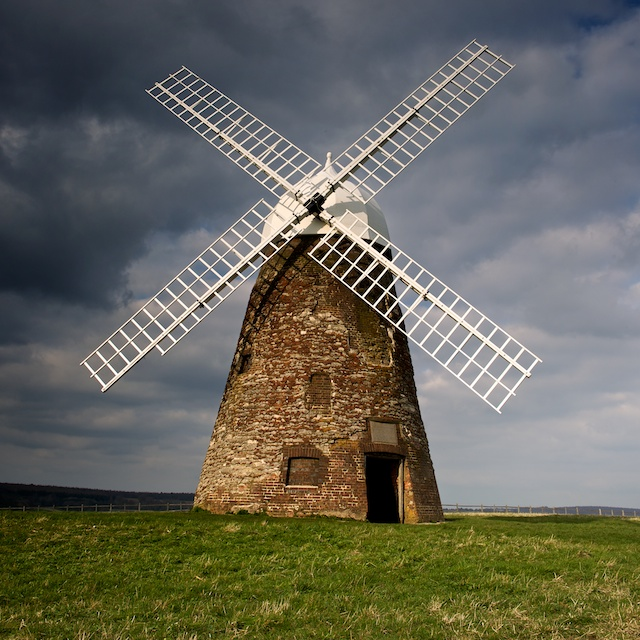
- Interactive map of Halnaker Windmill

Origin
- Mill name: Halnaker Mill
- Grid reference: SU 920 097
- Coordinates: 50.879°N 0.694°W
- Operator: West Sussex County Council
- Year built: Mid-18th century

Information
- Purpose: Corn mill
- Type: Tower mill
- Storeys: Four storeys
- No. of sails: Four sails
- Type of sails: Common sails
- Windshaft: Cast iron (post restoration addition)
- Winding: Fantail (missing)
- No. of pairs of millstones: Two pairs

Halnaker Windmill (/ˈhænəkər/ HAN-ə-kər) is a tower mill which stands on Halnaker Hill, north-east of Chichester, Sussex, England. The mill is reached by a public footpath from the north end of Halnaker, where a track follows the line of Stane Street before turning west to the hilltop. There is no longer any machinery in the brick tower.

1695 Map of Sussex by Robert Morden showing a windmill at Halnaker

== History ==
Halnaker Mill was first mentioned in 1540 as belonging to the manor of "Halfnaked". It was built for the Duke of Richmond as the feudal mill of the Goodwood Estate. The surviving mill is thought to date from the 1740s and is known to have been standing c.1780. Halnaker Mill was working until struck by lightning in 1905, damaging the sails and windshaft. The derelict mill was restored in 1934 by Neve's, the Heathfield millwrights as a memorial to the wife of Sir William Bird. Further repair work was done in 1954 by E Hole and Sons, The Burgess Hill millwrights. The mill was again restored in 2004. The mill is owned by West Sussex County Council.

== Description ==
Halnaker Mill is a four-storey tower mill with a sixteen-sided beehive cap. The mill was originally hand-wound, and later fitted with a fantail, which was not replicated when the mill was restored. The four common sails were originally carried on a wooden windshaft, which was damaged by a 1905 lightning strike. A cast-iron windshaft and wooden brake wheel from a wind sawmill at Punnetts Town were fitted. The windshaft is cast in two pieces, bolted together, and is too short for Halnaker Mill. Neve's inserted a spacer to lengthen it. The mill worked two pairs of overdrift millstones.

== Millers ==
- John Hervey 1810
- Charles Adams 1839–1870
- G R Watkins 1868–1905

== Hilaire Belloc ==
Halnaker Mill (or Ha'nacker Mill, reflecting the true pronunciation) is the subject of a poem by the English writer Hilaire Belloc in which the collapse of the mill is used as a metaphor for the tragic decay of the prevailing moral and social system.

Ha'nacker Mill

SALLY is gone that was so kindly,
Sally is gone from Ha'nacker Hill
And the Briar grows ever since then so blindly;
And ever since then the clapper is still...
And the sweeps have fallen from Ha'nacker Mill.

Ha'nacker Hill is in Desolation:
Ruin a-top and a field unploughed.
And Spirits that call on a fallen nation,
Spirits that loved her calling aloud,
Spirits abroad in a windy cloud.

Spirits that call and no one answers --
Ha'nacker's down and England's done.
Wind and Thistle for pipe and dancers,
And never a ploughman under the Sun:
Never a ploughman. Never a one.

There are musical settings of this poem by Peter Warlock and Ivor Gurney, amongst others.

== Roman Road ==
The track up to the mill from the southwest, leading through the Halnaker "Tunnel of Trees," is part of Stane Street, a Roman road in use since at least 70 AD. Cars are not allowed on the tree tunnel path.
