= Highdown New Mill, Angmering =

Windmill in Angmering, West Sussex, England

Angmering Windmill
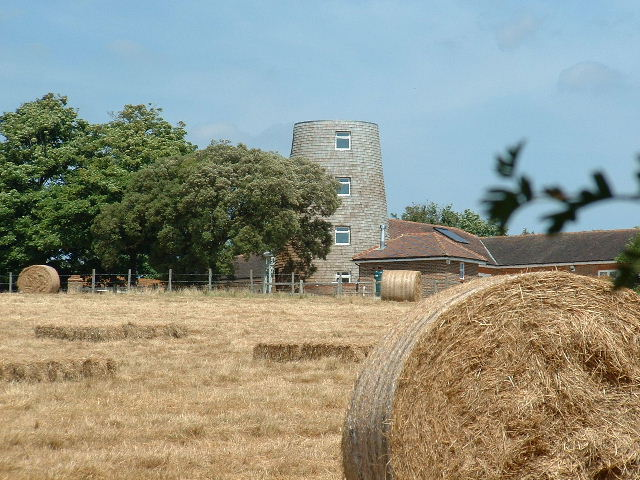
- The mill in 2005

Origin
- Mill name: Highdown New Mill; Ecclesden Mill
- Mill location: TQ 082 044
- Coordinates: 50°49′44″N 0°27′54″W
- Operator(s): Private
- Year built: 1826

Information
- Purpose: Corn mill
- Type: Tower mill
- Storeys: Four storeys
- No. of sails: Four sails
- Type of sails: Patent sails
- Winding: Fantail
- No. of pairs of millstones: Two pairs

Highdown New Mill or Ecclesden Mill is a tower mill at Angmering, Sussex, England which has been converted to residential accommodation.

== History ==
Highdown New Mill was built in 1826. The mill was working until 1872. In 1880, the cap and sails were blown off. By the 1930s the mill was an ivy clad ruin. It was converted into a house in the early 1970s. The tower has recently been clad in wooden shingles.

== Description ==
Highdown New Mill is a four-storey brick tower mill. It had four Patent sails and the beehive cap was winded by a fantail. The mill drove two pairs of millstones. All that remains today is the tower, with various additions and extensions.

== Millers ==
- Timothy pierce

1829 - 1872

References for above:-
