= Keymer =

Village in West Sussex, England

Coordinates: 50.92243°N 0.13249°W

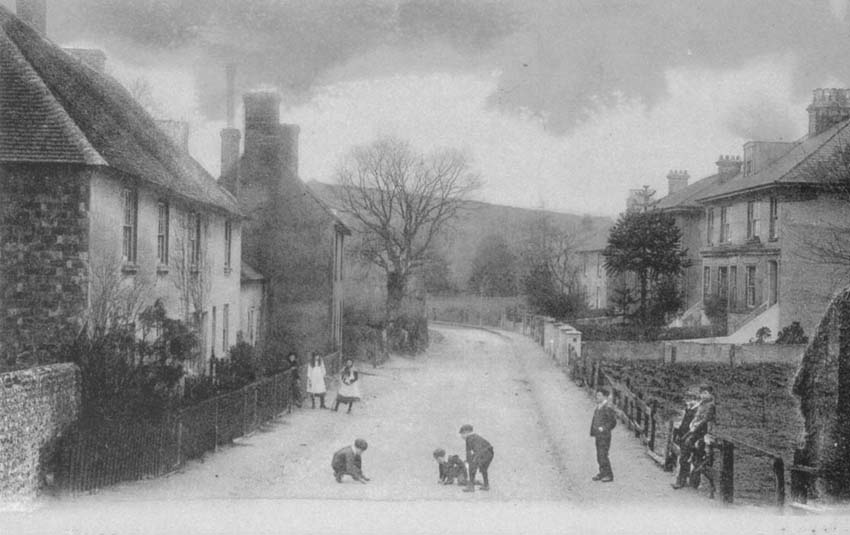
- Lodge Lane looking towards the South Downs c.1908

- Location within West Sussex
- OS grid reference: TQ313153
  - London: 40 miles (64 km) N
- Civil parish: Hassocks
- District: Mid Sussex
- Shire county: West Sussex
- Region: South East
- Country: England
- Sovereign state: United Kingdom
- Post town: HASSOCKS
- Postcode district: BN6
- Dialling code: 01273
- Police: Sussex
- Fire: West Sussex
- Ambulance: South East Coast
- UK Parliament: Arundel and South Downs

Keymer is a village in the civil parish of Hassocks, in the Mid Sussex district of West Sussex, England. It lies on the B2116 road 2.4 miles (3.9 km) south of Burgess Hill.

In 1971 the parish had a population of 5303. On 1 April 2000 the parish was abolished to form Hassocks. Both Keymer and Clayton's records go back as far as the Domesday Book. Keymer is situated just to the east of Hassocks and is only a matter of a few hundred yards from the boundary with East Sussex. It has a fine parish church, St Cosmas and St Damian Church. The oldest part of Keymer can be found in the area of this church and the Greyhound public house. Several buildings in this area are listed as being of special architectural or historic interest and the oldest dates from the 15th century. To the north-east of Keymer can be found Oldland Mill dating from the 18th century. It is one of the few remaining post mills still standing in the South East. The new burial ground that is now run by Hassocks Parish Council can be found located to the east of the Greyhound pub.

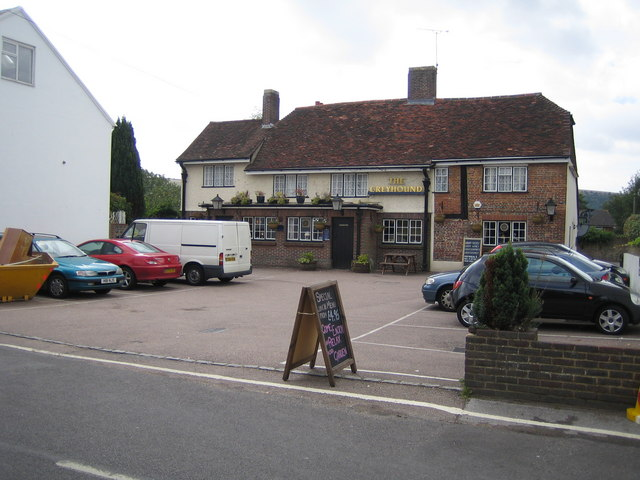
The Greyhound public house
