= Oldland Mill =

Windmill in Keymer, West Sussex, England

Oldland Windmill, Keymer
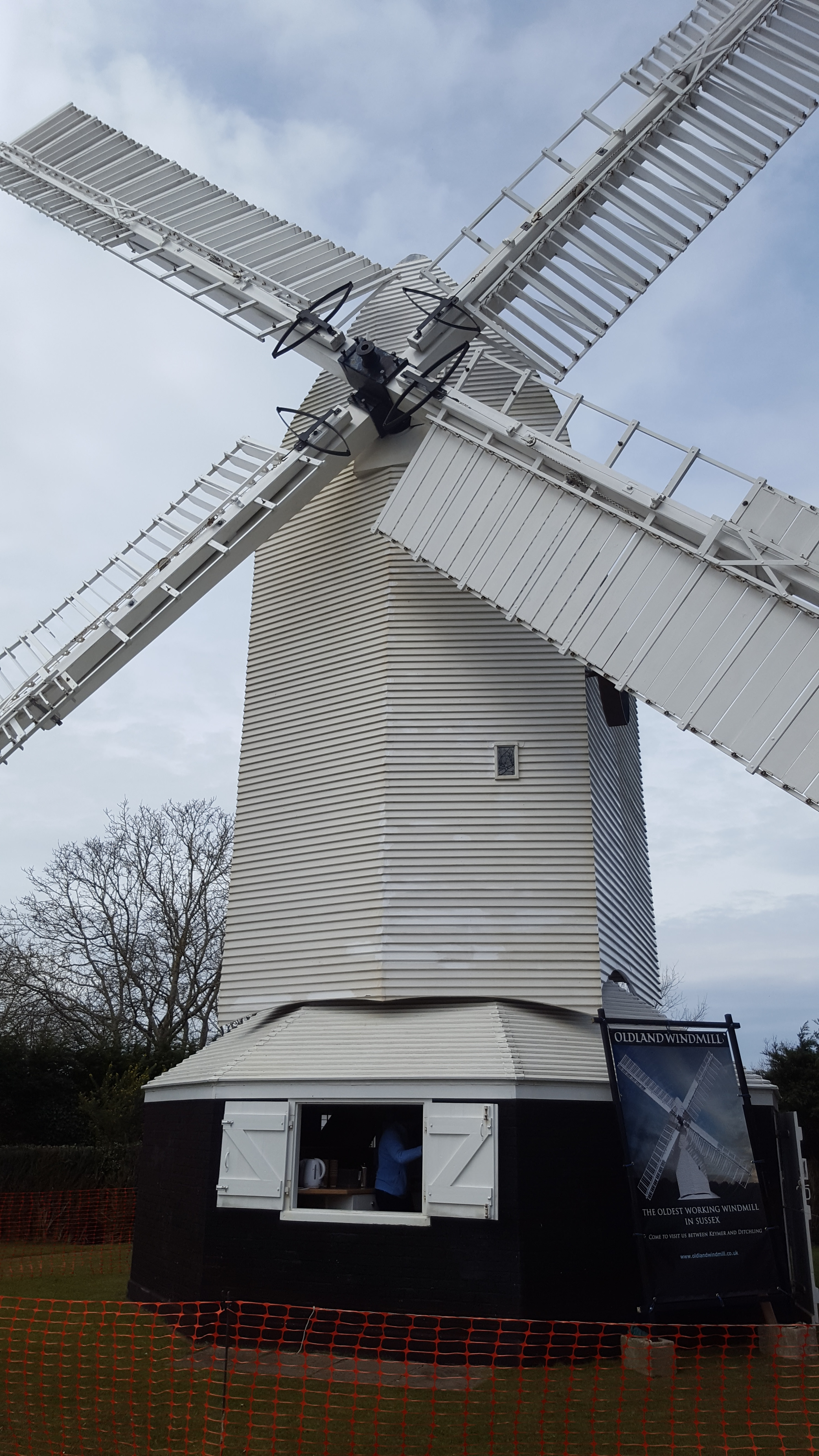
- The mill during an Open Day 2016
- Interactive map of Oldland Windmill, Keymer

Origin
- Grid reference: TQ 32118 16210
- Coordinates: 50.93022°N 0.12134°W
- Year built: c1700

Information
- Purpose: Corn mill
- Type: Post mill
- Roundhouse storeys: Single storey roundhouse
- No. of sails: Four
- Type of sails: Spring sweeps
- Windshaft: Cast iron
- Winding: Tailpole
- Auxiliary power: Steam
- No. of pairs of millstones: Two pairs, arranged Head and Tail

Oldland Windmill is an 18th-century post mill situated near the village of Keymer, West Sussex, England. It is a Grade II Listed Building.

== History ==
Oldland Windmill was built c. 1700 (the earliest record of a windmill in the area dates from 1703). It was originally an open trestle mill, with the roundhouse being added later. Records show that a mill stood in Keymer in 1755, and the mill was marked on a map dated 1783, but it is not shown on one dated 1795. The 1801 National Defence Schedule records the mill but the 1813 Ordnance Survey and Greenwood's 1829 map omit the mill. However, the larger scale Surveyor's Draft of the Ordnance Survey does show the mill. Records show that the mill was standing in 1828. Oldland Mill was working by wind until 1912. The mill began to fall into disrepair in the early part of the 20th century and continued to deteriorate.

The Sussex Archaeological Society acquired the mill in 1927 and repairs were carried out by E Hole and Sons of Burgess Hill in 1934. In 1976, at the Annual General Meeting of the Hassocks Amenity Association, there was a talk was given on the work of Weald and Downland Open Air Museum. The question of how to preserve Oldland Mill was raised. The mill was then in the ownership of the Sussex Archaeological Society. The mill was surveyed in 1977 by millwrights Vincent Pargeter and Edwin Hole and found to be close to collapse. Following negotiations with the Sussex Archaeological Society in 1979 the Hassocks Amenity Association leased the mill in 1980 and began a period of volunteer-led restoration.

Since then the mill has benefited from a DEFRA grant and substantial work has been completed, almost entirely carried out by volunteers. The mill was stripped to her bare essentials and many new parts completely and accurately built from scratch to replace rotten parts. The whole mill has been reclad and as of 18 October 2007 the four sweeps had been lifted into position. The mill ground its first batch of corn for many decades in October 2008, and following detailed commissioning the windmill now grinds flour regularly, being one of the few windmills registered for flour sales in Sussex. It is Sussex's oldest working windmill and today the mill is looked after by the volunteers of Oldland Mill Trust, a registered charity which owns the mill.

The original auxiliary drive system was restored and commissioned in 2015 when steam power was used to drive the mill for the first time in over 100 years.

== Restoration ==
The first working party on 2 August 1980 cleared rubbish around the mill and made a temporary repair to the roof of the roundhouse. In 1981, the two remaining sweeps and stock were removed with the assistance of sailors from HMS Daedalus. In 1983, an "A" frame was constructed to support the windshaft. The mill was restored over the next ten years, with much of the framing being replaced, including the trestle, crown tree, breast, tail and side frames. A new 8-foot-8-inch (2.64 m) diameter clasp arm head wheel and brake was constructed in 2006. The head wheel is of elm with hornbeam cogs and oak arms.

== Description ==
Oldland Mill is a post mill on a single-storey octagonal roundhouse, constructed of tarred brick with weatherboarding above. It has four spring sweeps and is winded by a tailpole. The windshaft is cast iron and was cast by Boaz Medhurst, the Lewes millwright, in 1873. There are two pairs of millstones, arranged head and tail.

== Millers ==
- George Bennett c. 1819 - 1828
- Joseph Roots Beard 1828 - 1840
- Joseph Winchester c. 1839 - 1860
- Thomas Ashdown 1860-1869
- Jesse Washington White 1869 - 1891
- John Turner c. 1878 -1895
- John White c. 1894 - 1904
- David Driver c. 1891 - 1912

Reference for above list is sourced from research carried out by volunteers of Oldland Mill, see Oldland Mill website.

== Gallery ==
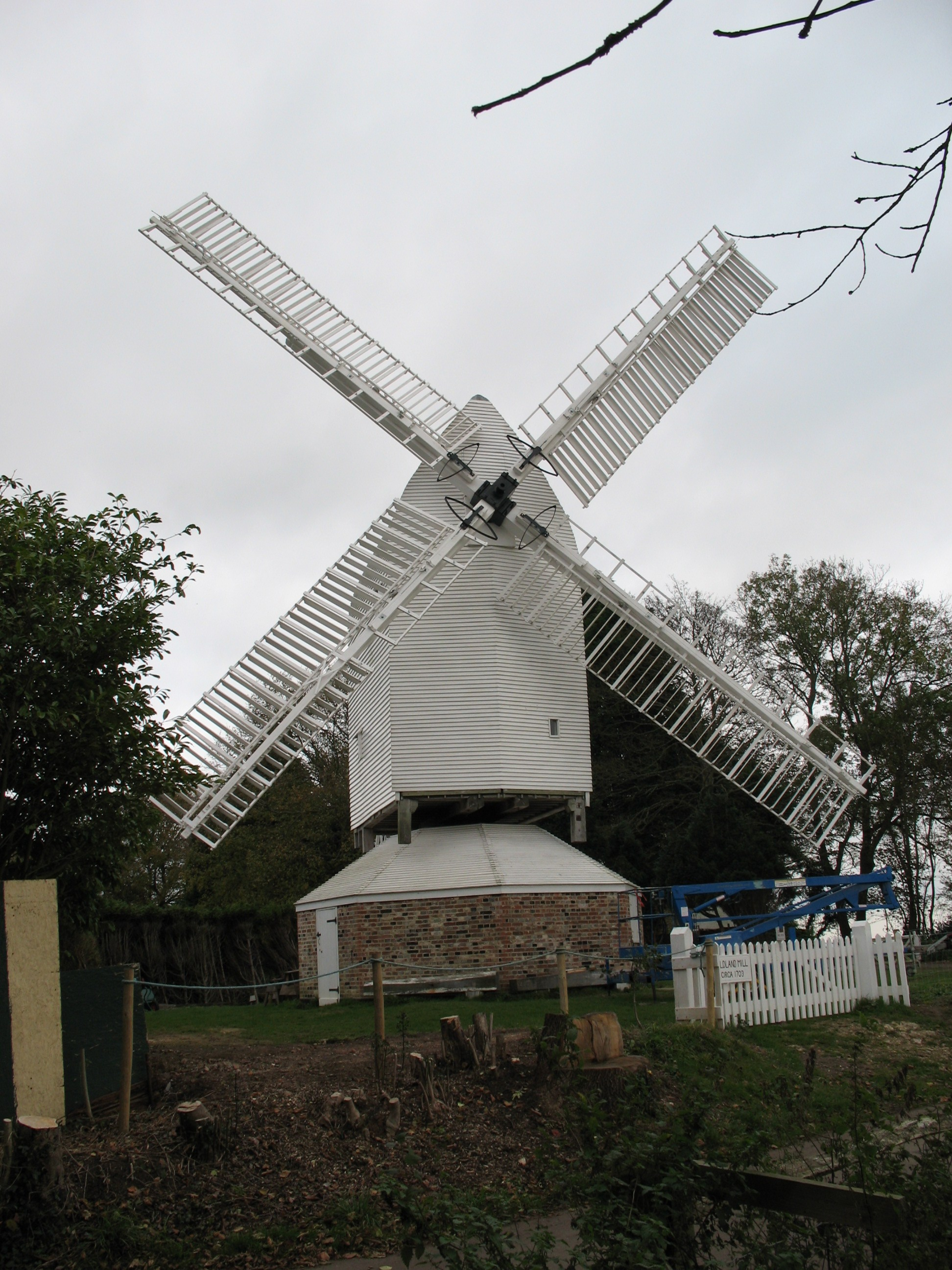
The mill in November 2007.

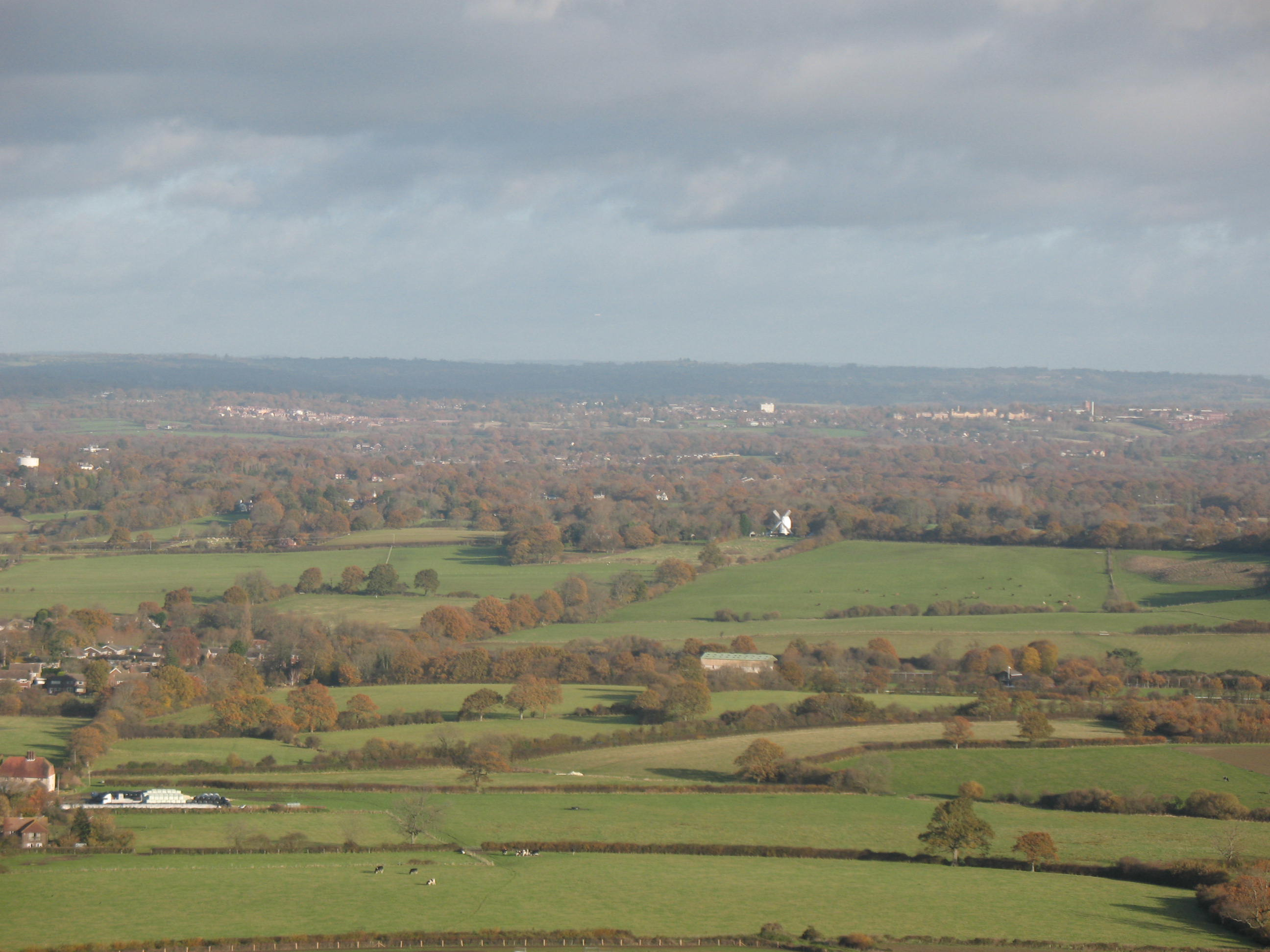
Oldland Mill in the context of its surrounding countryside.

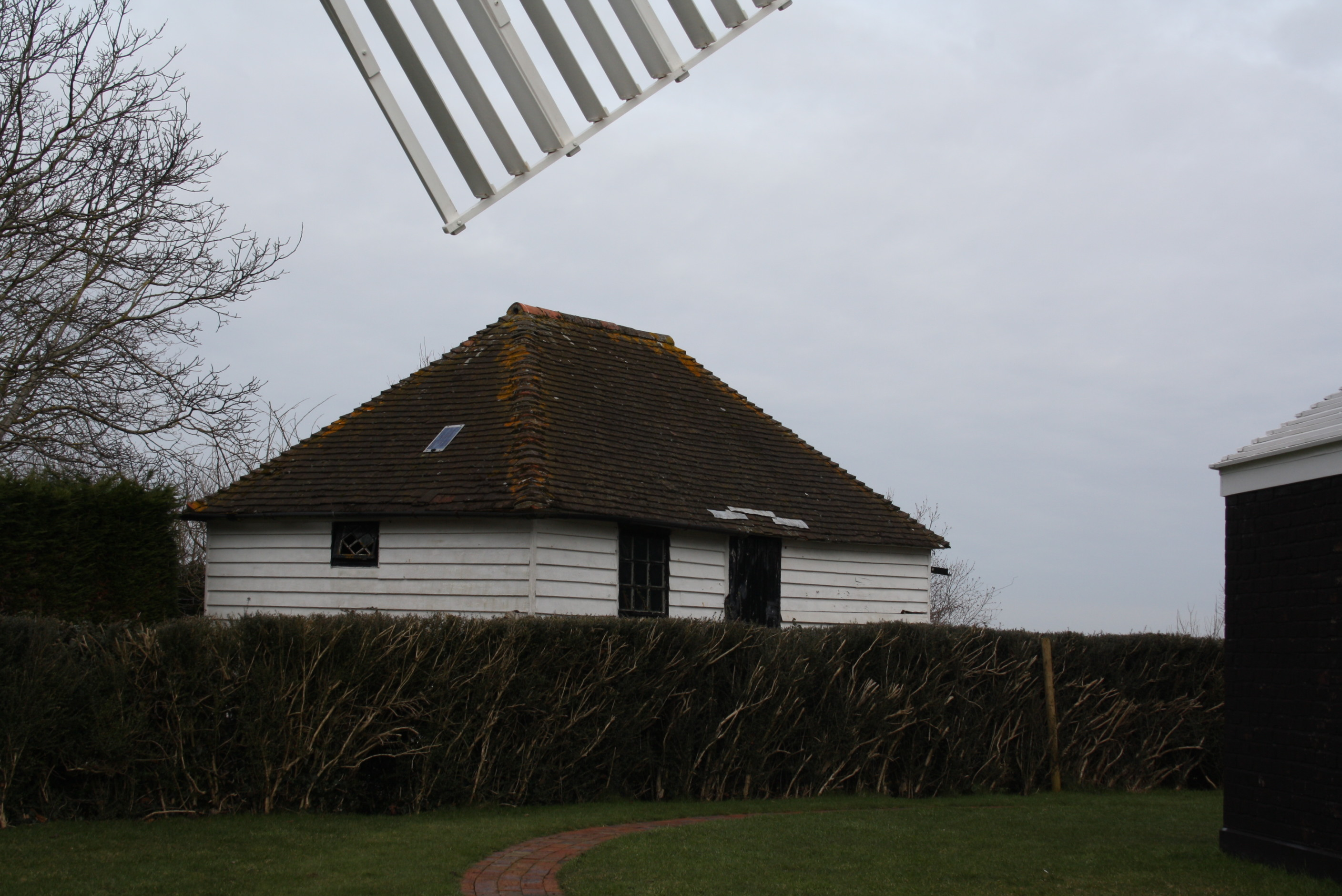
The original granary for the mill, Feb 09.

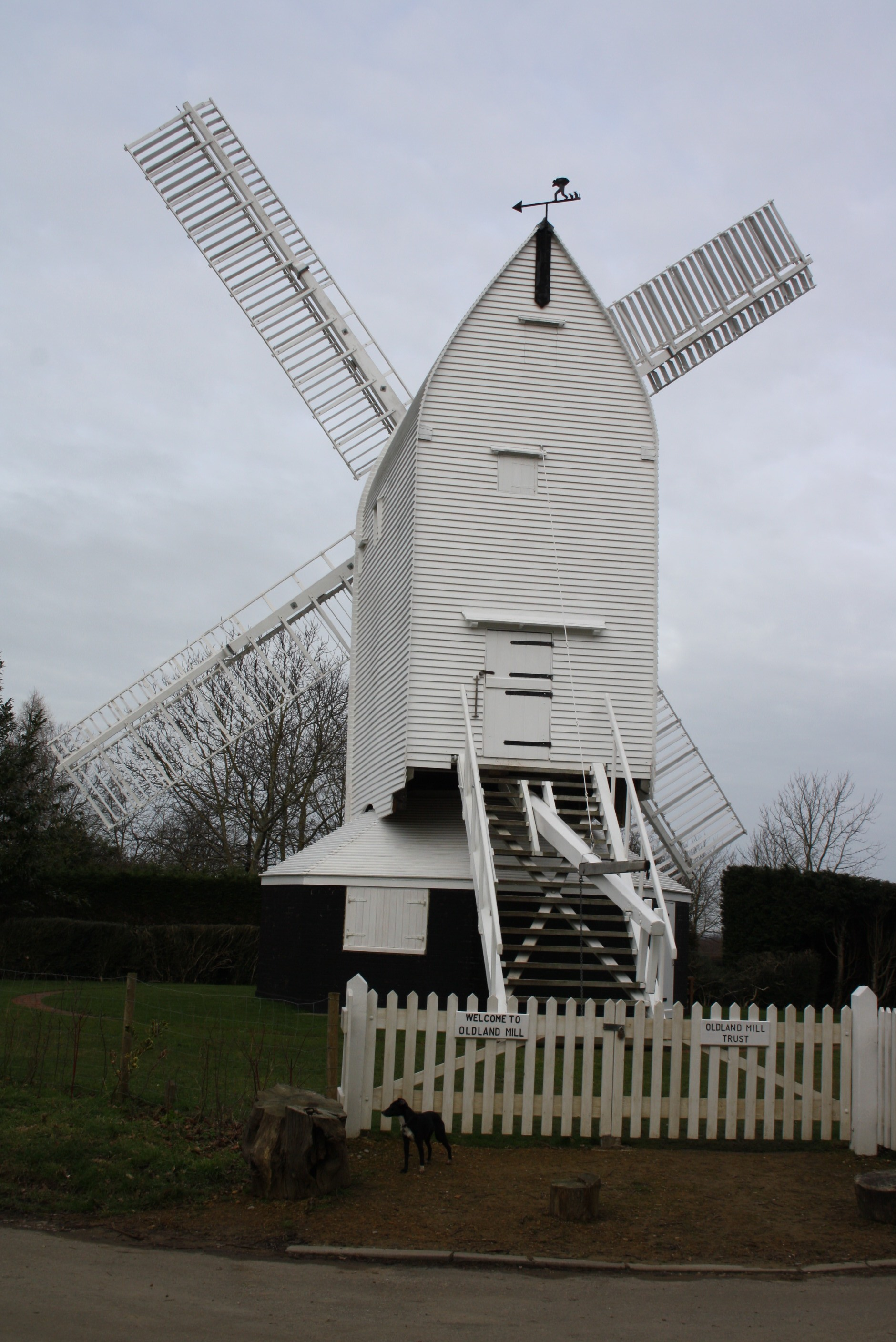
Rear view of the mill in February 2009.

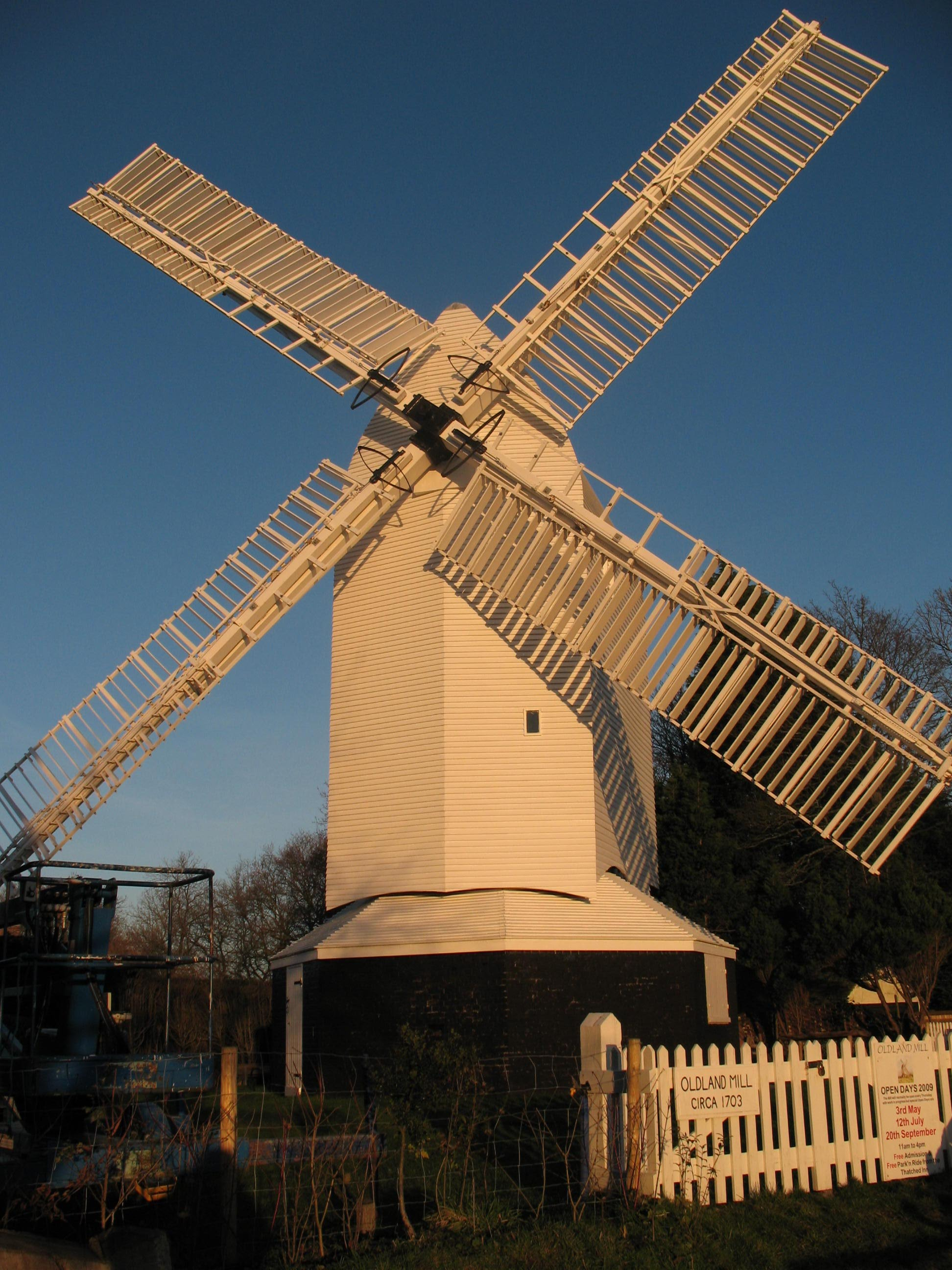
Oldland Mill in 2008.
