= High Salvington Windmill =

Post mill in High Salvington, West Sussex, England

High Salvington Mill
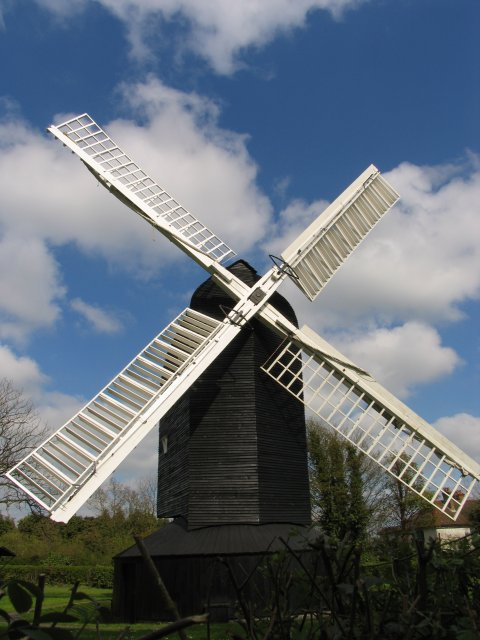
- The restored mill
- Interactive map of High Salvington Mill

Origin
- Mill name: Durrington Mill; High Salvington Mill
- Grid reference: TQ 123 067
- Coordinates: 50.84864°N 0.40667°W
- Year built: 1750

Information
- Purpose: Corn mill
- Type: Post mill
- Roundhouse storeys: Single storey roundhouse
- No. of sails: Four
- Type of sails: Two Common sails, two Spring sails
- Windshaft: Wood, with cast iron poll end.
- Winding: Tailpole
- No. of pairs of millstones: Two pairs, arranged Head and Tail

Durrington or High Salvington Windmill is a Grade II listed post mill in High Salvington, Sussex that has been restored and is in full working order. The mill stands 320 feet (98 m) above sea level and is able to take advantage of incoming sea winds.

== History ==
The earliest mention of a mill is in church records, which indicate that the miller was fined in 1615. Budgen's 1724 map showed a mill on this site. The current mill was built around 1750 and was apparently insured against fire in 1774. The windmill ground flour for the Worthing area until 1897 when it was purchased by Colonel T F Wisden. A condition of sale was that the mill had to be kept in working order. It was retired to a role of grinding animal feed until 1905. During much of the 20th century the mill was neglected although in 1907 the wooden roundhouse was replaced with a concrete structure used as a tea-room. In 1959, the mill was taken into the care of Worthing Borough Council. Messrs E Hole and Son, millwrights of Burgess Hill renovated the mill in 1961 and fitted a new pair of stocks and four new sails. In March 1976 one of the sails was broken off in a gale, and the other three removed. An inspection of the mill revealed she was not in good repair. Worthing Town Council set up a restoration project. The roundhouse was rebuilt to better replicate the original in 1990 and the restored mill began grinding again in 1991. A granary rescued from East Grinstead was re-erected at the mill in 1994. In 1998 it was discovered that one of the stocks was split. A new stock was made from laminated larch and the sails were refitted.

In early 2008, the three councillors from Salvington Ward, Mayor Heather Mercer, Cllr Jacqui Marsh and Cllr Noel Atkins, awarded the Mill Trust a total of £3,000, from the Mayor's fund and the pilot Ward Budget Scheme, respectively. This will contribute to the refurbishment of the current gatehouse as a visitor information centre, which it is hoped will be completed by the end of 2009.

== Mythology ==
Sadly, much has been written about Durrington Mill, (now called High Salvington Mill), which has found its way into official records and publications, but for which the original research appears to be lacking. This section attempts to dispel a number of these myths.

When the economics of wind and water-powered mill was undermined by new, steam-powered roller mills, millers of the old school had to find new ways to make a living. At High Salvington, the miller's wife, who was regularly asked for a glass of water by tourists who had toiled up the hill, hit upon the idea of offering a cup of tea and charging for this service. Thus was the High Salvington Windmill tea-room initiated. After miller Scutt's suicide, subsequent "millers" chose to emphasise the Mill as a tourist attraction and made money by charging for refreshments and to climb the steps to look at the mill and its machinery. While this contributed to keeping the mill and its machinery intact, the "millers" elaborated and embellished the known history of the mill, and thus an extensive body of mythology was created to attract and excite visitors. These myths often have been quoted and cited, as various millers lent credence to their stories by publishing them in leaflets, available to the visiting public.

=== The myth of the Post Tree ===
A favourite myth is that of the mill's post being part of a tree that grew on the site, the roots of which extended many feet below the ground. Apart from the fact that no mills were built like this in the 1740s, once the raised floor of the tea-rooms was removed from the hexagonal concrete round-house constructed in 1907, it is clear that the post, as is to be expected, is suspended above the ground, by diagonal quarter bars held in place against the cross-trees, themselves resting on brick piers, and that the base of the post is wedged into the centre of the cross-trees, with the wedges used to balance the post and adjust for the varying distribution of weight in the buck as stones, sails and machinery are added or removed.

This myth appeared in several publications, including an untitled leaflet published by St. Stephens Press, Bristol, in the 1950s. (It refers to 1897 as being "53 years ago", and the cover page bears text that includes "VISITORS to WORTHING should not fail to see THE 200 YEAR OLD WINDMILL With its wonderful Old Wooden Machinery"). According to this leaflet, "The post itself at Salvington is of great interest. About 20 years ago excavations were made at the base of it to discover what means had been used to plant it so firmly in the ground that it had borne the whole weight of the mill and withstood the winter storms for two hundred years. To the surprise of the diggers, 12 feet below the level of the ground, instead of coming to the end of the post, great roots were found stopping further progress, showing that a living oak had been trimmed and made use of as it stood."

The myth is refuted by Rex Wailes in his article "Some Windmill Fallacies", published in the 1961 volume of the Transactions of the Newcomen Society of Great Britain.

=== The "Worked in 1914" myth ===
"The mill is known to have worked again in 1914."

Brunnarius claims that the mill worked again in 1914, but at that time, the mill was fixed in one position, and the construction of the hexagonal concrete roundhouse prevented the mill from being winded a full 360 degrees. It was not until the restorers removed the corners of the concrete roundhouse in the 1970s, that the mill was able to turn fully. The restored wooden roundhouse, built to the pre-1907 design, which has replaced the concrete roundhouse, allows the mill to be winded 360 degrees. No evidence has been found to support Brunnarius' claim.

=== The "Fantail" myth ===
According to the Listed Buildings Register, maintained by English Heritage, the windmill at High Salvington is supposed to have a fantail. This data appears to have made its way into the National Monuments Record, (also maintained by English Heritage), which cites in its notes:

(TQ 1227 0666) Originally Durrington Mill, now usually called Salvington Mill. Post type with round house and fantail. Date 1700 over the door. Machinery of the mill in working order.

from page 21 of the 21 May 1976 edition of Worthing's publication of the List of Buildings of Special Architectural or Historic Interest.

However, no evidence for this has ever been found, and when it was bought by Worthing Borough Council in 1959, winding the mill, as far as was possible—see The "Worked in 1914" Myth), was achieved by means of pushing on the tail-pole.

Various "old-timers" who helped the High Salvington Mill Trust reported that the inspector who is supposed to have visited the windmill in 1949 never came as far as High Salvington, so perhaps this is the source of the error.

=== The private house myth ===
The same National Monuments Record also cites a Field Investigator's comment, dated from 31 December 1970, which states,

"Mill restored externally and in excellent condition. Now a private house".

The reference for this is given as F1 ASP 31-12-70.

Although a millers cottage did exist on the site it was demolished some decades ago to make way for access to properties built to the rear of the houses adjacent to the mill. The hexagonal concrete roundhouse of the mill, constructed in 1907/8, was still being used to serve teas in 1970 and there was no living accommodation either then or since.

== Restoration ==
The mill under restoration

Inspection of the mill after the loss of a sail in 1976 revealed that the trestle had been weakened by Death Watch Beetles. The machinery and millstones were removed from the mill and placed in storage. A steel frame was constructed and used to support the mill whilst the trestle and crown tree were replaced. A new 10-foot (3.05 m) diameter brake wheel was constructed and fitted in 1985. One pair of sails was fitted in 1987 The sails were turning in the Great Storm of 1987 although the brake was on. The second pair of sails were fitted in 1988. The roundhouse was rebuilt in 1990 and the restored mill ground for the first time on 4 April 1991.

In 2008 discovery of rope burns on the studding by the spout floor window revealed that this was probably originally a pop-hole through which the brake rope would have been dropped, thus allowing the miller to operate the brake from the side of the mill exterior, rather than from behind the mill, as had been the practice in recent years. The "millwrights" restoration and maintenance volunteer decided to improve the authenticity of the restoration and replace the window with a pop-hole and removable shutter.

In July 2009 scaffolding was erected so that the exterior of the buck could be repainted. Window frames have also been repaired and repainted.

== Description ==
High Salvington Windmill is a post mill with a single storey roundhouse. The mill rotates on a solid oak post which is in turn supported by a trestle of heavy pine quarter nars supported on two crosstrees, themselves resting on four brick piers. The trestle is protected by a wooden roundhouse, modelled on the pre-1907 structure. On top of the post, a Samson head is fitted and this supports the crown tree—a large, heavy oak timber to which the body of the mill is attached.

The windmill has a pair of common sails and a pair of spring sails, carried by a wooden windshaft with a cast iron poll end. The mill has two pairs of millstones, arranged head and tail. The head stones are Derbyshire Peak stones and used for rough grinding, while the tail stones are made from pieces of French Burrstone, embedded in plaster of Paris. These millstones were used for fine grinding. Each pair of stones is driven by its own wheel, called the head wheel and tail wheel. The Friends of High Salvington Mill have had to rebuild the head wheel, but the tail wheel, an original of a rare "compass arm" design, is now too fragile to be used for grinding.

Tenter gear is installed to adjust the gap between the stones, and along with the usual system of levers adjustable via a tentering screw, the mill also has a rope attached that allows the miller to lift the half-ton (500 kg) runner stone, while governors adjust to the wind speed and raise or lower the gap accordingly.

== Millers ==
- Daniel Redman 1824–1847
- William Beard 1847–1871
- Walter Brown 1871–1897
- Alfred Samuel Coote –1898
- Stephen Scutt –1906
- Coote 1914

References for above:-

== Glynde windpump ==
Glynde Windpump
- Interactive map of Glynde Windpump

Origin
- Mill location: Originally at
- Grid reference: TQ 457 087
- Coordinates: 50°51′32″N 0°04′08″E
- Year built: Mid nineteenth century

Information
- Purpose: Pumping water
- Type: Hollow post mill
- No. of sails: Four
- Type of sails: Boarded sails
- Winding: Tailpole
- Type of pump: Plunger

The High Salvington Windmill Trust acquired in late 2007, and completed restoration during 2007–09, the Glynde Windpump, a much smaller hollow post mill. This originally stood at grid reference TQ 457 087 - 50.859°N 0.069°E, it was built in the mid nineteenth century, possibly to supply water to steam engines which powered an aerial ropeway at a nearby quarry, or possibly to raise water from a cutting parallel to a series of lime kilns, for slaking the lime. The rotting remains of the pump were rescued by Andrew Norman who started the restoration, before its acquisition by the High Salvington Mill Trust, which has completed the restoration and installed it beside the existing windmill.

The trestle has been embedded in solid foundations, on which the restored post has been mounted. The buck (body) has been restored and resized according to photographs of the original taken in 1929, and the gear ratio between the windshaft and crankshaft has been adjusted, with a new gear wheel cut. An easily removable roof has been installed and new sails have been designed and constructed. The visually restored windpump was unveiled on Sunday 11 May 2008, during National Mills Weekend.

Errors in construction resulted in a set of rebuilt sails that rotated clockwise. In 2009 the sails have been rebuilt so that they now correctly rotate anti-clockwise. A pump was acquired and in July 2009 it was refitted. Installation of the pump and connection to the con rods take place in August and September 2009, which now allows the Glynde Wind Pump to raise water again for the first time in over fifty years.

== Nutley wind engine ==
Nutley Wind Engine
- Interactive map of Nutley Wind Engine

Origin
- Mill location: Originally at
- Grid reference: TQ 457 087
- Coordinates: 50°51′32″N 0°04′08″E
- Year built: Late nineteenth century

Information
- Purpose: Pumping water
- Type of sails: Fan
- Winding: Tailvane
- Type of pump: Plunger

In 2013, the High Salvington Mill Trust acquired from a farm at Nutley, in many pieces, a 44 ft (13 m) steel mast mounted with both a wind engine and above this, a wind generator. The wind generator was a later addition that would have prevented the successful operation of the wind engine.

The original mast was split into two to provide a mast for the separated wind engine and generator. The wind engine is a Hercules oil-bath wind engine with an 8-foot diameter fan. Many parts were missing requiring the maintenance volunteers to research and make new parts. In 2020 a well pump was acquired and fitted to the wind engine.

The wind generator has a 6-foot diameter two-bladed wooden impeller driving a Lucas 24V DC lorry generator capable of very high speeds. The volunteers have built a control box with a series of light bulbs so that the faster the impeller turns, the more lamps are lit, with the full 120 W output lighting all of the bulbs.

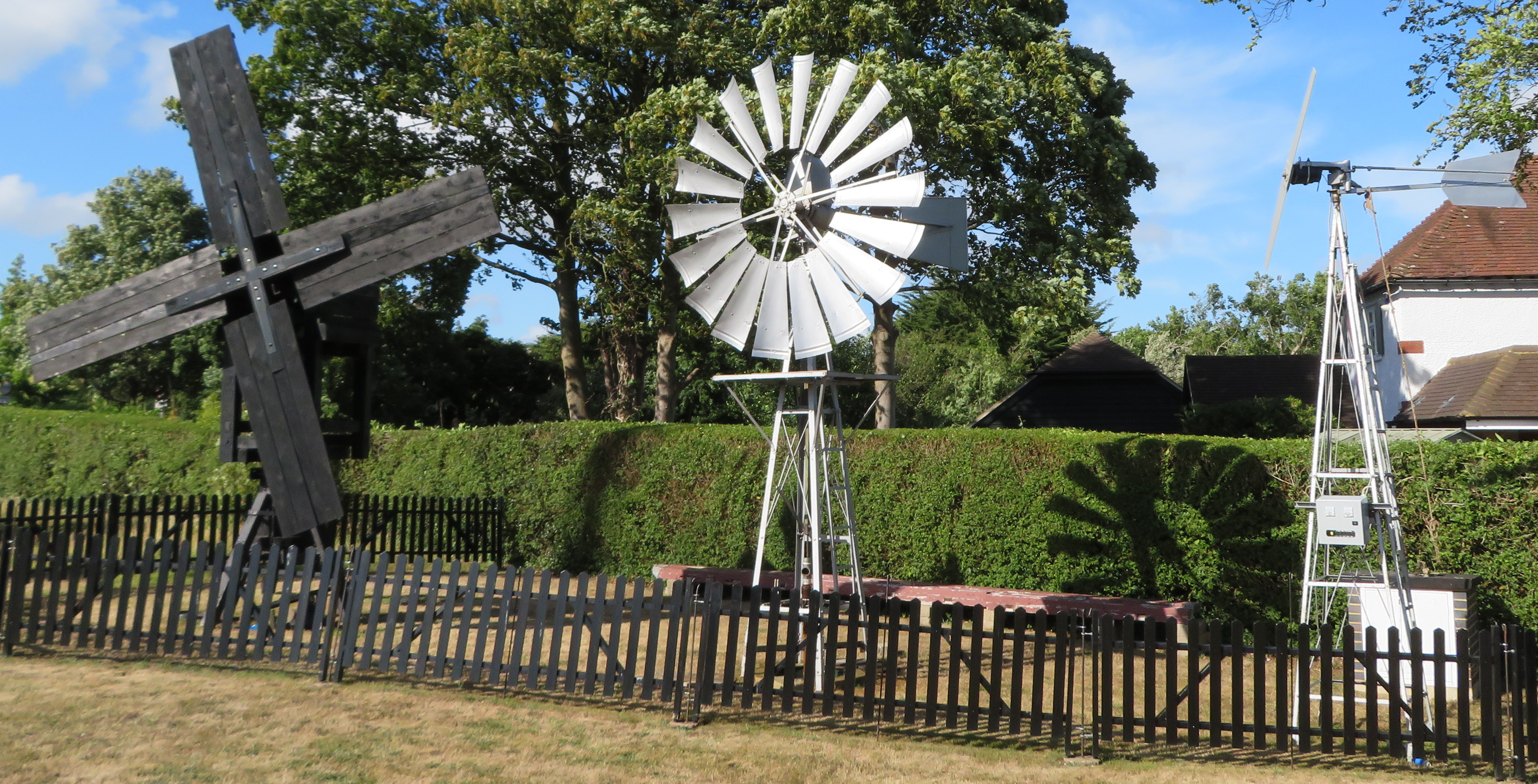
Glynde Windpump (aka Beddingham Water Pump), Nutley Wind Engine and Nutley Wind Generator restored and operating on 28 June 2020 in High Salvington Windmill field.

== Public access ==
High Salvington Windmill is open to the public, from 2:30 pm to 5 pm, every first and third Sunday of the months April through to September, inclusive. Volunteer "millwrights" meet at the site every Thursday evening, from 7 pm until 9 pm, and the first and third Sunday morning of every month throughout the year. All the maintenance and restoration work at the mill is carried out by the volunteers. Organised parties can also arrange to visit the site for guided tours at other times, by arrangement with the Visit organiser.
