= Ditchling Common =

Country park in East Sussex, England

Coordinates: 50.951°N 0.102°W

- Site of Special Scientific Interest
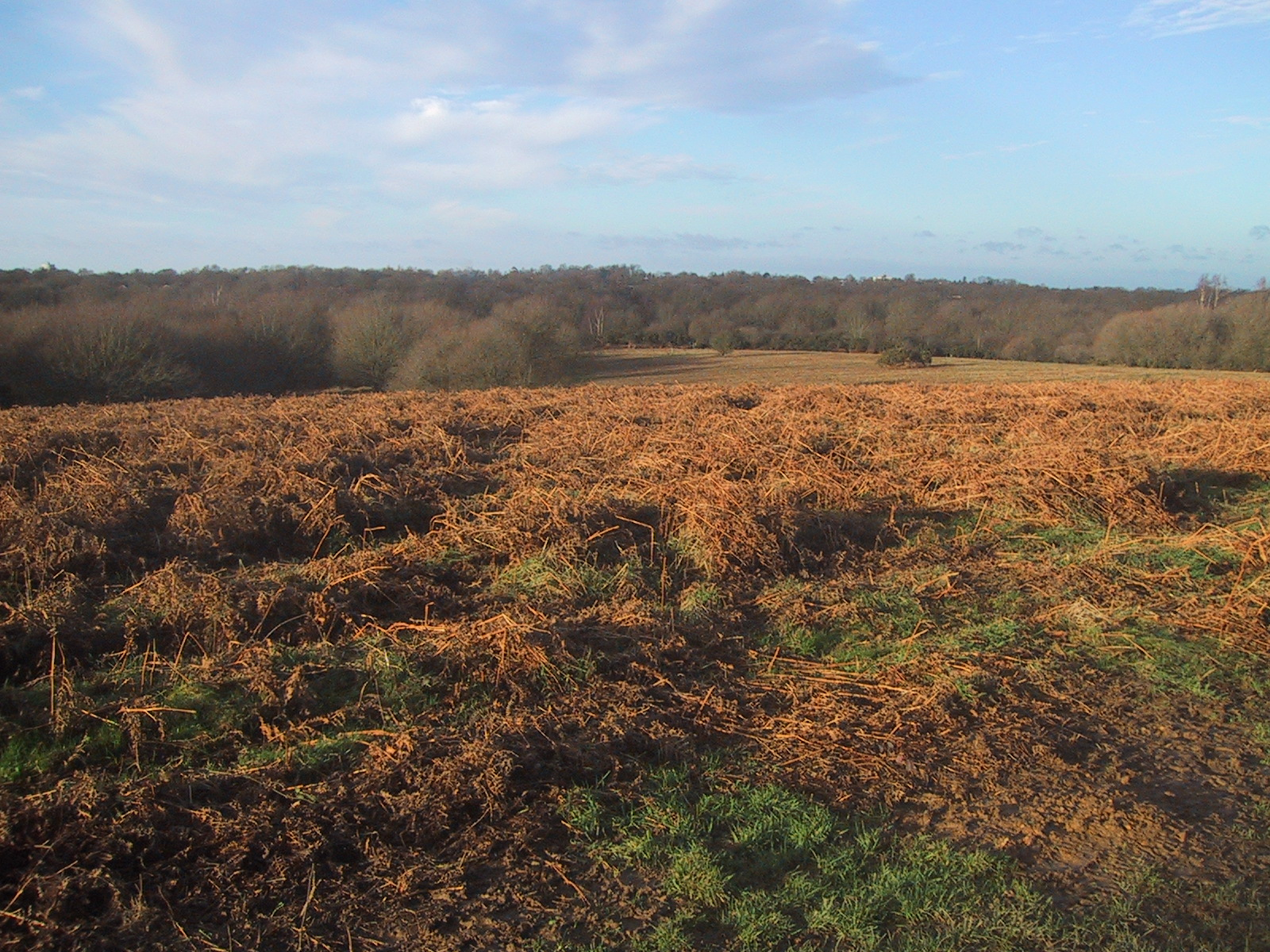
- Location of Ditchling Common.
- Area of search: East Sussex
- Grid reference: TQ 334 185
- Interest: Biological
- Area: 66.5 hectares (164 acres)
- Notification date: 1986
- Location map: Magic Map

Ditchling Common is a 66.5-hectare (164-acre) biological Site of Special Scientific Interest south-west of Wivelsfield in East Sussex. It is a country park. which is owned and managed by East Sussex County Council. In many respects, it is a biologically important site of the Low Weald supporting a rich array of biodiversity not found anywhere else in the area.

== Areas ==
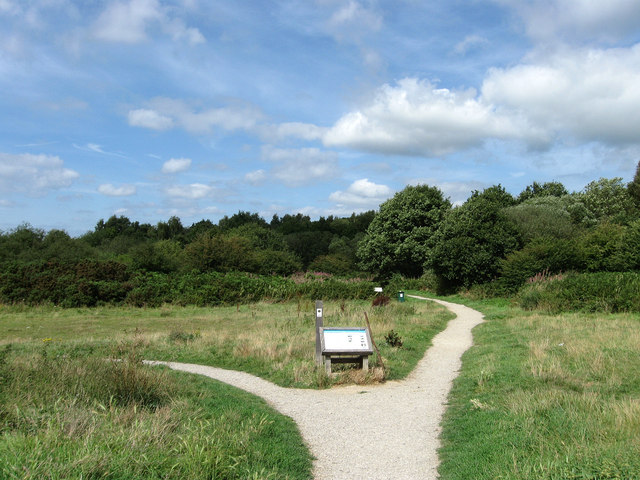
Ditchling Common Country Park - geograph.org.uk - 1446467

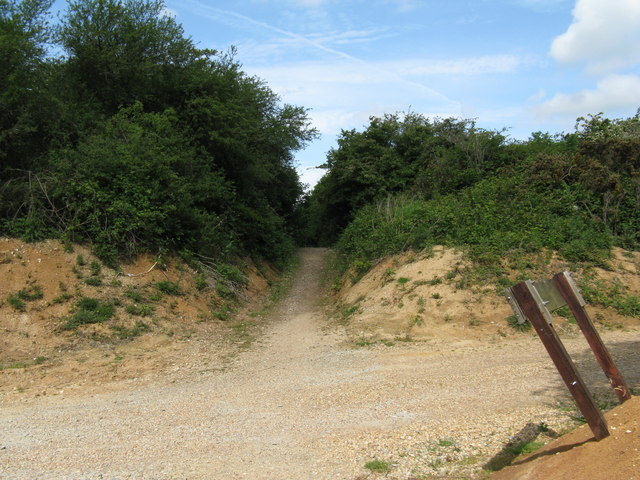
Track at the SE corner of Ditchling Common Country Park - geograph.org.uk - 1313963

There are two areas of Ditchling Common: the northern area, which is owned by East Sussex County Council and has become Ditchling Country Park, and is itself split in two by the fast traffic of the Ditchling Road (B2112); and the southern area south of Folders Lane, which is owned by Commoner's Association.

Despite the publicised Country Park walks concentrating on the area east of the Ditchling Road, the area to the west is as rich in biodiversity with rare plants such as the tiny adder's tongue fern and big swarms of petty whin.

== History ==
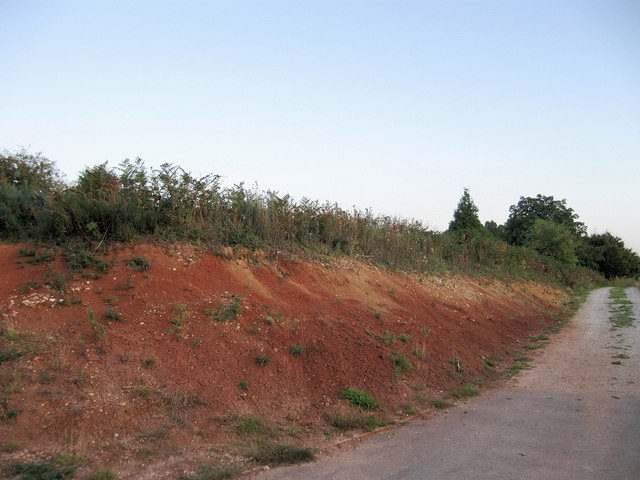
Entrance to Ditchling Common - geograph.org.uk - 1471834

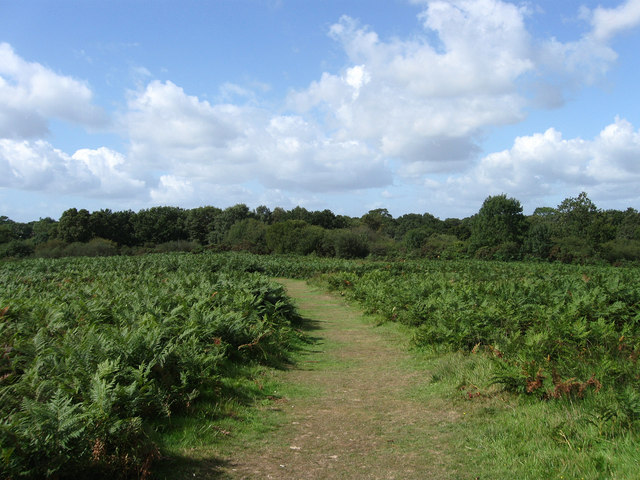
Ditchling Common Country Park - geograph.org.uk - 1463048

The extent of the present Ditchling Common (including the Country Park) has changed little since 1300. The manor of Ditchling, held in modern times by the Marquess of Abergavenny, owned the Commons since in the medieval ages and only sold the land in 1950. During the following twenty-five years the richness of the Common's biodiversity was damaged. The northern park became overgrown with scrub following a cessation of grazing the area. On the commoners' Common, where three-quarters was ploughed up and fertilised. There was a public outcry from local people and other commoners, who pursued a campaign to stop the destruction of the area's rich biodiversity. Ultimately legal action was brought on the farmers and the archaic biodiversity was partially saved.

The northern half of the Common was bought by East Sussex County Council in 1974 and the area was designated a Country Park. Since then they have started partial grazing of the area. The southern half is now managed by the Commoners Association who in recent years have done excellent work to save the southern area's biodiversity.

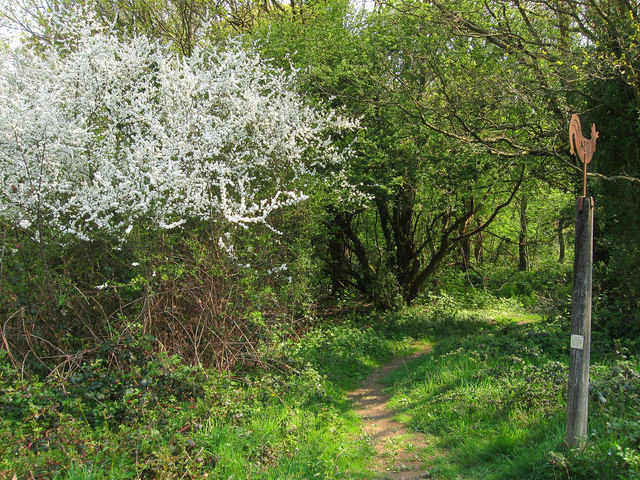
Jacob's Post - geograph.org.uk - 2365313

At the very north of the Common one can find Jacob's Post (TQ 337 197), which has the date 1734 on the bird at its top. It remembers the pedlar, Jacob Harris, who in that year committed murder in the Kings Head pub and as a reminder of his crime had his dead body suspended on a gibbet outside the pub for many months. The post itself took on a life of its own as people believed infertility and other ailments could be cured by touching the post. This continued into the 19th century despite the original post being replaced.

== Biodiversity ==
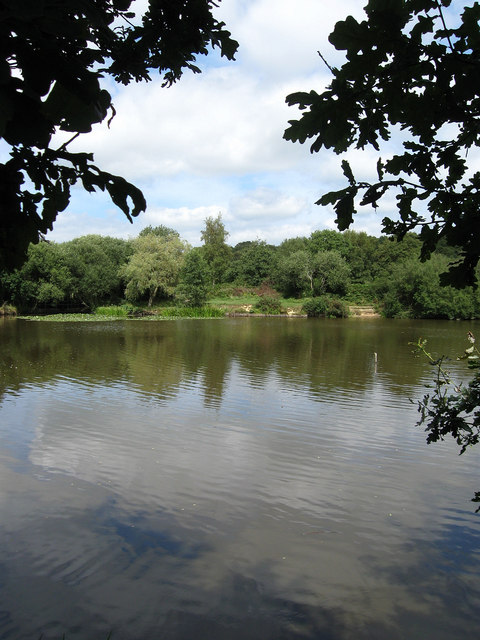
Fish Pond, Ditchling Common - geograph.org.uk - 1446462

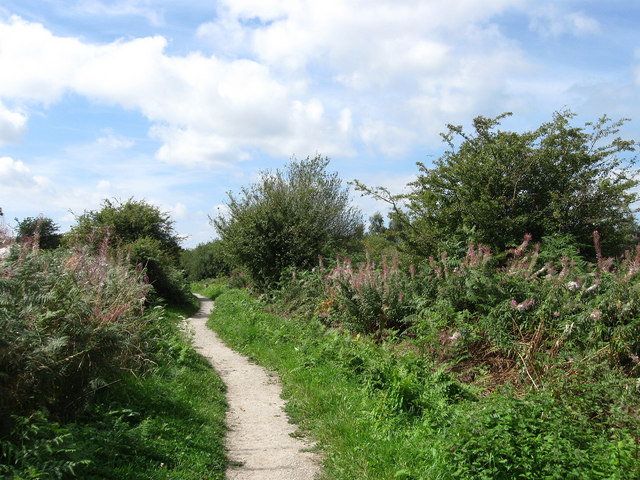
Trail, Ditchling Common - geograph.org.uk - 1446464

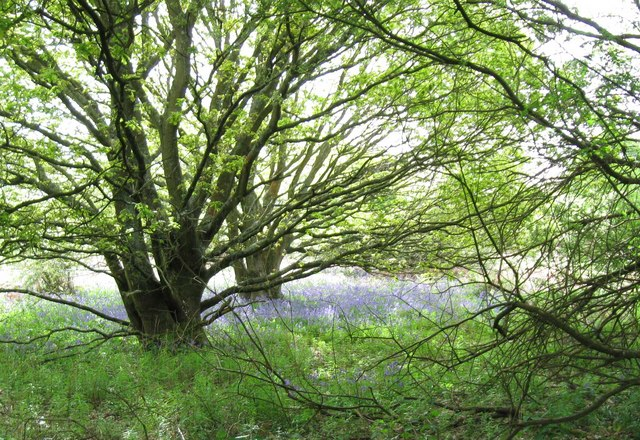
Bluebells at Ditchling Common - geograph.org.uk - 1588811

The common has several different types of acidic heath grassland, together with areas of bracken, scrub, woodland, streams and a pond. The rich butterfly and moth fauna includes several uncommon species. It is in this area of the middle Sussex Low Weald that the old clay land community of herbs and sub-shrubs, grasses and sedges, on the spectrum from marsh to dry slope, is at its most complete.

The Country Park is well known for its spring time display of bluebells, but unlike most bluebell displays that are usually protected by a leafy tree canopy, here the bluebell are sheltered by bracken. There is still petty whin, meadow thistle, bitter vetch, saw wort, dyer's greenweed, heath bedstraw, tormentil, betony and devil's bit scabious. There are also many orchids including heath spotted and common spotted orchid and a kaleidoscope of hybrids. It is one of the few truly native sites for wild columbine flowers and ling heather clings on. There are still rarities too including narrow buckler and adders tongue ferns, pignut, and the little heath milkwort. In springtime there are emperor moths, in summer, there are green and purple hairstreak butterfly and in 2017 a well established colony of the rare and elusive black hairstreak butterfly was discovered that is thought to have existed undetected for some time.

The commoners' Common is the only part where the character of the original common is maintained and there is still a sense of landscape-scale openness. The biodiversity of the western part survived the farmers intent on ploughing and fertilising the grassland in the decades following the second world war. Now the Commoners Association do important work to save the area's biodiversity. Cattle grazing and scrub control are systematic and regular and as a result the old vegetation is still intact. There is a mosaic of tufted hair grass and purple moor grass, tormentil and dyer's greenweed, with low clumps of dwarf and European gorses, some thorn scrub, and a few super-special 'lawns' of rare marsh plume meadow thistle, with accompanying least willow, spring, carnation and glaucous sedges and quaking grass. On the marshy winter grassland, snipe are still visitors. In late summer large serotine bats forage and the forest specialist's Bechstein's and Barbastelle bats are also present across both parts of the Common.

Despite the richness of today's Common, much has been lost. Nightingales used to breed here, but no longer. On both the commoners' Common and the Country Park, the closely related sub-shrubs Dyer's greenweed and petty whin were host to dependant populations of at least seven rare micro-moths, which were the chief fame of the Common to lepidopterists. Most, if not all of the micromoths, are now gone, but their evocative names, such as large gold case bearer, the greenweed leaf miner, the greenweed flat body, and the petty whin case bearer, are remembered. Also gone are the rare tawny and flea sedges, starfruit at the pond, and silver studded blue and small pearl-bordered fritillary butterflies. The marsh fritillary is also gone despite many reintroductions attempts between 1960 and 1991.
