= Funke Abimbola =

Nigerian lawyer

Funke Abimbola MBE
- Born: Nigeria
- Education: Newcastle University
- Known for: General Counsel, Legal Work and Public Service
- Website: funkeabimbola.com

Funke Abimbola MBE is a Nigerian businesswoman and lawyer. She advocates for diversity across UK society, specifically focusing on the legal profession.

Abimbola attended Newcastle University to study law. Funke Abimbola is a mother of a 19 year old who is presently at Newcastle University studying Software Engineering.

== Early life and education ==
Abimbola comes from a family of medical doctors. She was educated at Burgess Hill Girls. She did not study medicine because of her fear for "pains and blood" (algophobia and hemophobia). She obtained her law degree from Newcastle University and returned to Nigeria to sit for the Nigerian Bar examination. Abimbola became a mother at the age of 28 years while working with Campbell Hooper. In the year 2000, she qualified as a solicitor. Her father died in 2012 after being diagnosed with cancer.

== Career ==
Abimbola became the most senior black solicitor for Roche's pharmaceutical operations in the UK, Ireland, Gibraltar and Malta.

She went to Nigeria for the preparation for the Nigerian Bar examination. While there, she worked with F. O. Akinrele & Co.

After her return to the UK from Nigeria in the mid-1990s, she worked with Wembley Plc where she qualified as a corporate/commercial lawyer. She later moved to Campbell Hooper where she became a solicitor. In 2012, she joined Roche UK with the position of Managing Counsel (UK and Ireland). She also served as UK Data Protection Officer. In December 2015, she became the general counsel and company secretary of the same organization and was promoted to general counsel and head of financial compliance in January 2017.

She encountered challenges securing an entry-level job in the UK. According to First 100 Years, "I found it extremely difficult to secure an entry-level position when I finished the QLTT (now QLTS) transfer test and needed to gain experience before qualification. To get my foot in the door, I drew up a list of the top 100 law firms specializing in corporate law and did the same with the top 50 in-house teams. I then proceeded to cold-call the heads of department at all 150 organizations. This led to several interviews, including one with a major, fully listed PLC. At that interview, the head of legal (who is English but whose partner is of Asian descent) asked me if I thought my race had been a factor in me not getting interviews with other organizations. That was, honestly, the first time I had even considered race as being something that could inhibit my progress. Thankfully, I was offered a role by her and was able to qualify as a solicitor in-house."

Abimbola is a strong advocate of corporate and social diversity. As a public speaker and legal practitioner, she was recognised and won many awards for her work. In 2013 she was featured in Diversity League Table publication as one of the Black Solicitors. In 2014, she was nominated for a National Diversity Award, and in the same year she was nominated for the Law Society Excellence Awards. In 2015, she won a Positive Role Model Award. In 2010, she was appointed governor of Uxbridge College, London, on a four-year term.

She received a 'Point of Light' award from the UK Prime Minister in October 2016, recognising the impact of her voluntary diversity work in the UK. In June 2017, she was awarded the M.B.E. (Member of the Order of the British Empire) by Queen Elizabeth II for services to diversity in the legal profession and to young people.

She received an honorary doctor of laws from the University of Hertfordshire in September 2019, recognising her contributions to social and corporate diversity.

== Awards and recognition ==
Year	Class	Category	Awarding body
2015	Winner	Positive Role Model (Gender) Award	National Diversity Awards 2015
2015	Winner	Career Woman of the Year Award	Women4Africa
2015	Winner	Outstanding Woman in Professional Services	Precious Award
2015	Winner	Inspiring Member of the Year	Inclusive Network Awards
2015	Certificate of Merit	British Citizen Awards 2015	
2016	Winner	Outstanding Diva of the year	Divas of Colour
2016	Winner	International Diva of the Year	Divas of Colour
2016	Winner	Best Public Speaker	CA Awards by C. Hub Magazine
2016	Winner	Best Non-fiction	CA Awards by C. Hub Magazine
2016	Recognition	Recognition award for outstanding achievements and contributions	Women4Africa
2016	Point of Light	Volunteers Award	UK Prime Minister 2016
2017	M.B.E. (Member of the Order of the British Empire)	For services to diversity in the legal profession and to young people	Queen Elizabeth II
2019	L.L.D. (Honorary Doctor of Laws)	For contributions to social and corporate diversity	The University of Hertfordshire

== See also ==
- Ifeoma Malo
- Ade Hassan
- Ade Olufeko
