= Hassocks & Victoria (electoral division) =

Former electoral division of West Sussex, England

Coordinates: 50.92922°N 0.14317°W

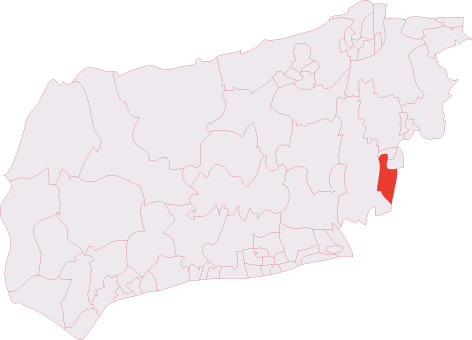
Hassocks & Victoria
Shown within West Sussex
District:	Mid Sussex
UK Parliament Constituency:	Arundel & South Downs, Mid Sussex
Ceremonial county:	West Sussex
Electorate (2009):	9703

Hassocks & Victoria was an electoral division of West Sussex in the United Kingdom, and returned one member to sit on West Sussex County Council from 1997 to 2017. In 2017 it was replaced by a new division, Hassocks & Burgess Hill South.

== Extent ==
The division covered the southwestern part of the town of Burgess Hill and the villages of Clayton, Hassocks and Keymer.

It comprised the Mid Sussex District wards: Burgess Hill Victoria Ward and Hassocks Ward; and of the following civil parishes: the southwestern part of Burgess Hill, and Hassocks.

== Election results ==
=== 2013 Election ===
Results of the election held on 2 May 2013:

Hassocks & Victoria
Party	Candidate	Votes	%	±%
Conservative	Andy Petch	1,464	41.4	−2.8
UKIP	Raplh Wylam	678	19.1	N/A
Liberal Democrats	Kristian Berggreen	635	17.8	−32.6
Labour	Linda Taylor	383	10.8	+6.0
Green	Victoria Standfast	285	8.0	N/A
Independent	Scott McCarthy	113	3.2	N/A
Majority		786	22.3	
Turnout		3,558	35.1	−8.8
Conservative gain from Liberal Democrats		Swing		

=== 2009 Election ===
Results of the election held on 4 June 2009:

Hassocks & Victoria
Party	Candidate	Votes	%	±%
Liberal Democrats	Colin Wilsdon	2,159	50.4	+7.5
Conservative	Mandy Thomas-Atkin	1,895	44.2	+4.1
Labour	Jenny Epstein	204	4.8	−5.8
Majority		264	6.2	+3.4
Turnout		4,258	43.9	−26.0
Liberal Democrats hold		Swing		

=== 2005 Election ===
Results of the election held on 5 May 2005:

Hassocks & Victoria
Party	Candidate	Votes	%	±%
Liberal Democrats	Colin Wilsdon	2,818	42.9	
Conservative	Stephen Bell	2,632	40.1	
Labour	Arleen Piercy	697	10.6	
Green	David Hammond	423	6.4	
Majority		186	2.8	
Turnout		6,570	69.9	
Liberal Democrats win (new seat)				
