= Norrenberger Group =

Nigerian investment banking firm

- Industry: Finance
- Founded: 2017
- Headquarters: Abuja, Nigeria,
- Area served: Nigeria
- Key people: Ibrahim Aliyu (Chairman) Tony Edeh (Group Managing Director/CEO) (Board Members) Ngozi Ifeoma Malo Andrew Nweke Eniola Adedayo Nduka Ikeyi
- Services: Financing Insurance Asset management
- Number of employees: 500
- Subsidiaries: IEI Insurance Limited Norrenberger Pensions Limited Norrenberger Advisory Partners Limited (NAPL) Norrenberger Asset Management Limited (NAML) Norrenberger Securities Limited
- Rating: BBB+ rating by Agusto & Co
- Website: https://norrenberger.com

Norrenberger Group is a financial services group based in Abuja, Nigeria. It was established in 2017 and offers financial advisory services to individual and corporate clients. According to its website, Norrenberger Group has four subsidiaries: International Energy Insurance Company, Norrenberger Pensions Limited, Norrenberger Advisory Partners Limited, and Norrenberger Asset Management Limited. The group has also received several awards from various organizations in the past three years including the coveted BusinessDay award.

== Subsidiaries ==
International Energy Insurance Company

International Energy Insurance Company (IEI) is an insurance company that was acquired by Norrenberger Group in December 2021. The acquisition was approved by the National Insurance Commission (NAICOM), the regulatory body for insurance in Nigeria. Prior to the acquisition, IEI had been facing financial difficulties and regulatory pressure for years. According to BusinessDay, IEI's stock had traded only seven times in four years (2018-2021), it had failed to pay dividends to shareholders, and it had been unable to meet the recapitalization requirements set by NAICOM.

Norrenberger Pensions Limited

Norrenberger Pensions Limited is a Pension Fund Administrator (PFA) that was formerly known as IEI Anchor Pensions. As part of the acquisition deal, Norrenberger Group took over 80 percent of the shares held by IEI in its PFA subsidiary. The name change from IEI Anchor Pensions to Norrenberger Pensions Limited was approved by the National Pension Commission (PENCOM), the regulatory body for pensions in Nigeria, in 2022.

== Awards ==
Norrenberger Group have received the following awards from different organizations:

- Most Trusted Finance and Investment Brand Award (2020) by Africa Finance Awards
- The Wealth Product of the Year (2020) by BusinessDay BAFI Awards
- Best Customer Care Award (2021) by West Africa Innovation Awards
- Africa's Most Outstanding Financial Solutions Group (2021) by African Business Excellence & Leadership Awards
- BBB+ rating (2022) by Agusto & Co
- Deal of the year award
