= St Wilfrid's Church, Burgess Hill =

St Wilfrid's, Burgess Hill
- Saint Wilfrid's Roman Catholic church
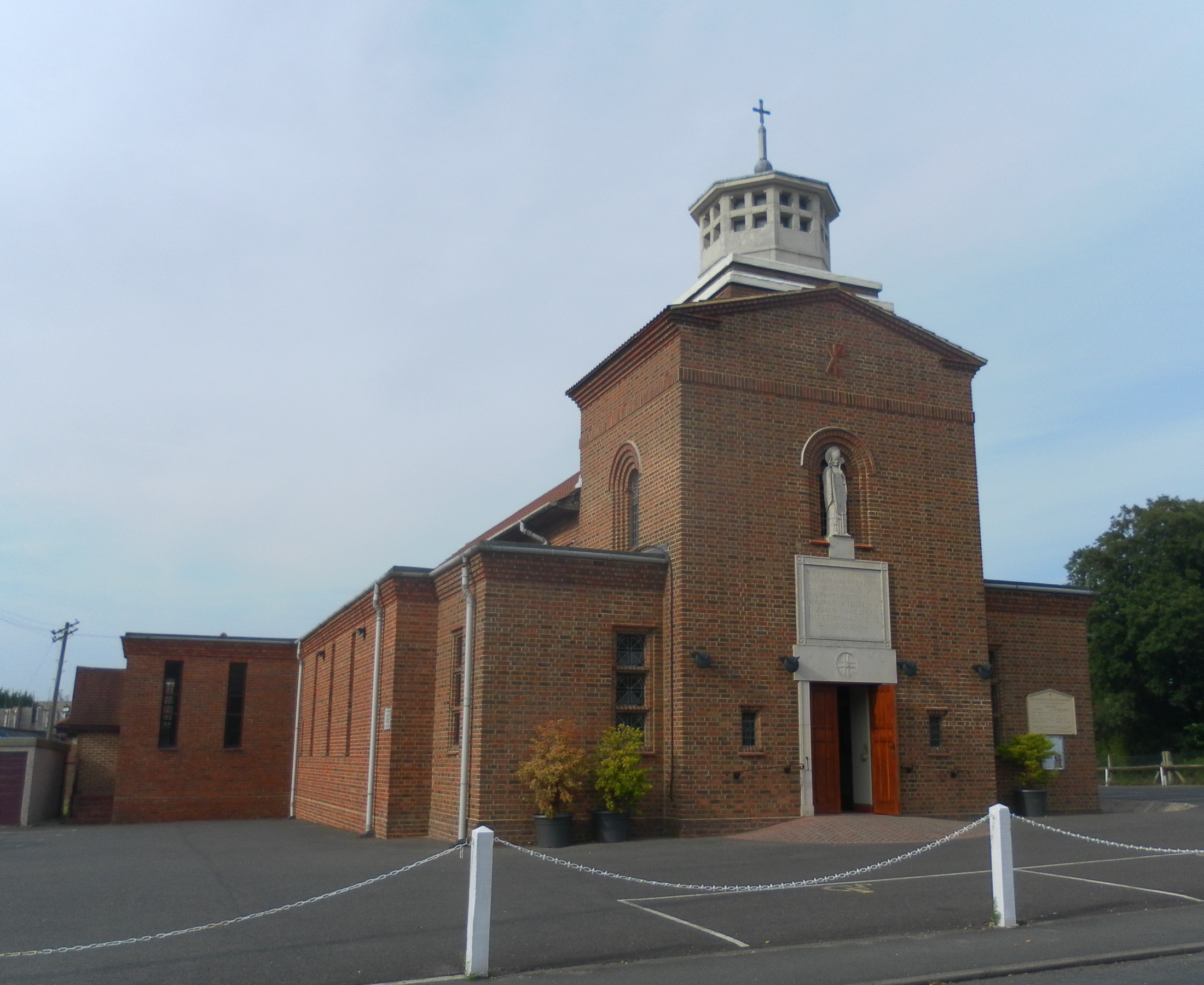
- Saint Wilfrid's church

- Location in West Sussex
- 50°57′13″N 0°08′04″W
- Location: Burgess Hill, West Sussex
- Country: England
- Denomination: Roman Catholic

History
- Founded: 1940
- Dedication: Saint Wilfrid

Administration
- Diocese: Roman Catholic Diocese of Arundel and Brighton

St Wilfrid's Church is a Roman Catholic church in Burgess Hill, West Sussex.

A former Congregational chapel in Grove Road served as Burgess Hill's Roman Catholic church until St Wilfrid's was built by a local firm in 1940. Frank Brangwyn provided the Stations of the Cross and Joseph Cribb, a pupil of Eric Gill, carved the statue of Saint Wilfrid above the entrance.

It is part of the Diocese of Arundel and Brighton.

It is associated with St Wilfrid's Catholic Primary School.

== Bibliography ==
- Avery, Frederic M. (2001). Burgess Hill in Old Picture Postcards (Volume 2). Zaltbommel: European Library. ISBN 90-288-3562-8.
- Dudeney, Mark; Hallett, Eileen (2003). Bygone Days in Burgess Hill. Burgess Hill: Mid-Sussex Books. ISBN 0-9530625-2-X.
