= Hassocks & Burgess Hill South (electoral division) =

Electoral division of West Sussex, England

Coordinates: 50.92922°N 0.14317°W

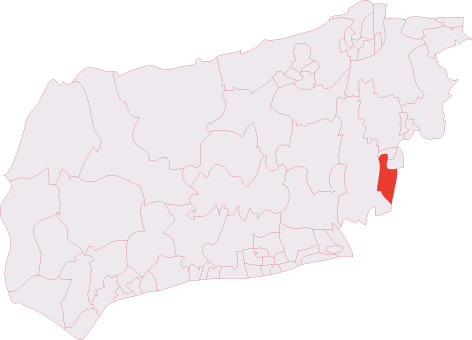
Hassocks & Burgess Hill South
Shown within West Sussex
District:	Mid Sussex
UK Parliament Constituency:	Arundel & South Downs, Mid Sussex
Ceremonial county:	West Sussex
Electorate (2009):	9703
County Councillor
Kirsty Lord (LD)

Hassocks & Burgess Hill South is an electoral division of West Sussex in the United Kingdom, and returns one member to sit on West Sussex County Council. It replaced the Hassocks & Victoria electoral division in 2017.

== Extent ==
The division covers the southwestern part of the town of Burgess Hill and the villages of Clayton, Hassocks and Keymer.

As of 2017 it comprises the southern part of Meeds ward (Burgess Hill) along with the Hammonds Ridge estate (Burgess Hill) and Hassocks Ward.

== Election results ==
=== 2017 Election ===
Results of the election held on 4 May 2017:

Hassocks & Burgess Hill South
Party	Candidate	Votes	%	±%
Liberal Democrats	Kirsty Lord	1,545		
Conservative	Tudor Ellis	1,525		
Labour	Linda Taylor	549		
UKIP	Charles Burrell	182		
Green	Nicholas Dearden	175		
Majority		20		
Turnout		3,976		
Liberal Democrats win (new seat)				
