= Hugo Rittson-Thomas =

British photographer

Hugo Rittson-Thomas is a British photographer. He is best known for high-profile photographic portraiture, including portraits of Queen Elizabeth II, the Dalai Lama and David Cameron.

== Biography ==
For many years Rittson-Thomas worked in film and television, including as a producer and director for Channel 4 and London Weekend Television. He worked closely with Janet Street Porter as a director on the influential youth TV programme Network 7. He gave up film and television to study Fine Art at Central Saint Martins, Middlesex University (Hornsey College of Art), under Professor Jon Thompson and Goldsmiths University of London. He subsequently trained as a qualified fine art teacher, completing his PGCE at the UCL Institute of Education, London before teaching for a while in London Comprehensive schools.

== Work ==
Rittson-Thomas works principally as a portrait photographer. His 2014 project the Queen's People is a photographic portrait of the British monarchy today, and those who sustain it. The project comprises fifty formal portraits based on special access granted by The Queen, Prince William and Prime Minister David Cameron, as well as to members of the clergy, livery, royal palace, Parliament, military and peers. The photographs offer a detailed insight into the traditional dress codes and pageant of the United Kingdom, whilst focusing on the characters behind the royal and ceremonial regalia. The Queen's People, was published by Assouline in 2016.

Rittson-Thomas's first book, Secret Gardens of the Cotswolds, was published by Frances Lincoln on 5 February 2015. The book was launched at the London Garden Museum. In September 2015, Great Gardens of London was published, revealing a wealth of private gardens, from 10 Downing Street, Clarence House (courtesy of HRH Prince Charles) and the American Ambassador's residence, Winfield House. Most recently, Rittson-Thomas has produced the Secret Gardens: Private Sanctuaries of Britain's Artists and Creators, featuring the gardens of Sting, Anish Kapoor, Rupert Everett and Prue Leith. The book is due for release in October 2017.

Before he became a portraitist, Rittson-Thomas made fine art film and video art. He made a noted video work about Princess Diana, which featured in the art exhibition Temple of Diana. The show was curated by the art writer Neal Brown.

In 2021 he published Wildflowers for the Queen: A Visual Celebration of Britain's Coronation Meadows (Wildflower Press, ISBN 978-1527249592) to celebrate the Coronation Meadows which had been created to celebrate the 60th anniversary of the Coronation of Elizabeth II.

== Charity work ==
Rittson-Thomas has supported The National Deaf Children's Society as Committee Chairman for a fundraiser, David Beckham - Interpretations in Art & Other Matters, that celebrated the charity's Diamond Jubilee Year. The event raised £150,000 for the charity. Other charities supported include Nineteen Raptures and RAPt.
