= St Paul's Catholic College =

Location
- Jane Murray Way; Burgess Hill, West Sussex, RH15 8GA; England; 50°57′59″N 0°09′16″W

Information
- Type: Academy
- Religious affiliation: Roman Catholic
- Established: 9 September 1963
- Founder: Roman Catholic Diocese of Southwark
- Local authority: West Sussex
- Trust: Bosco Catholic Education Trust
- Department for Education URN: 148753 Tables
- Ofsted: Reports
- Headteacher: Rob Carter
- Staff: 106 (approx.)
- Gender: Coeducational
- Age: 11 to 18
- Enrolment: 1,150 (approx.)
- Website: http://www.stpaulscatholiccollege.co.uk/

St Paul's Catholic College is a mixed-sex Roman Catholic secondary school and sixth form located in Burgess Hill, West Sussex, England.

== History ==
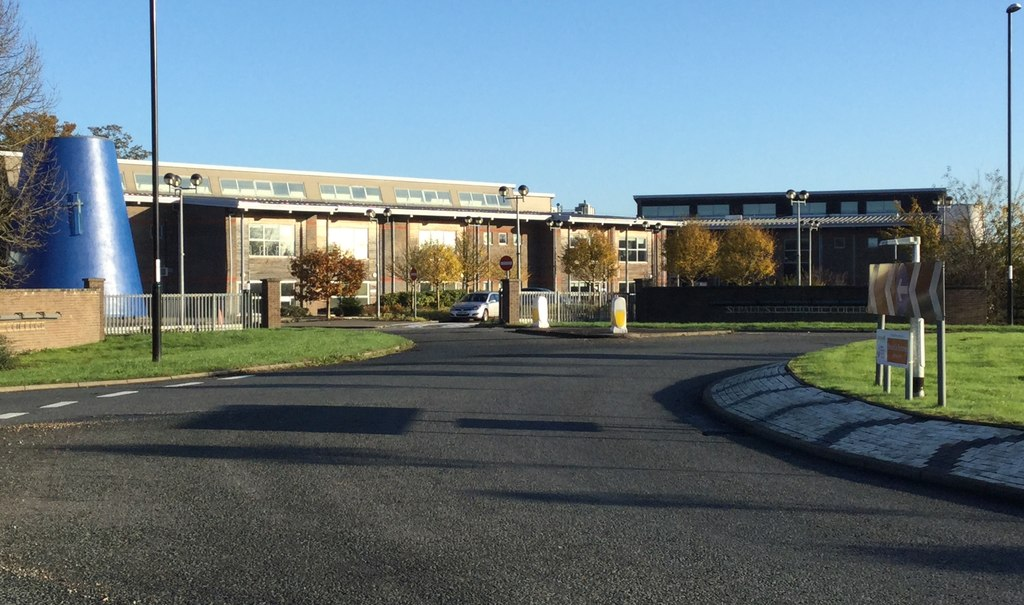
St Paul's Catholic College entrance

The College first opened on 9 September 1963 as a modern secondary school serving the Mid-Sussex area. It was originally situated in the nearby town of Haywards Heath but relocated to its current site at the northwestern edge of Burgess Hill in September 2004.

In April 2013, the College was appointed as a National Teaching School and National Support School by the Department for Education.

The school had around 1,850 students in 2014.

Previously a voluntary aided school administered by West Sussex County Council, in January 2022 St Paul's Catholic College converted to academy status. It is now sponsored by the Bosco Catholic Education Trust and continues to be under the jurisdiction of the Roman Catholic Diocese of Arundel and Brighton.

== Organisation ==
The college accepts children from the age of eleven through eighteen. There are six houses in the school: Athens, Corinth, Valletta, Damascus, Lystra, and Rome.

The school has expanded the role of e-learning in the classroom, as well as being a fair-trade school, encouraging student support for both local and international good causes.

== Performance ==
Results in GCSE, A-levels, and the college has been named consistently within the highest performing secondary schools nationally.

St Paul's was graded as 'outstanding' by Ofsted in 2007, 2008, and 2011, 2019 and 2023. In 2019, it was graded as 'outstanding' in the Catholic School (Section 48) inspection by the diocese which evaluates the quality of Catholic education and the spiritual life of the school.
