= International Bible Training Institute =

Evangelical Pentecostal Bible college in Burgess Hill, West Sussex, United Kingdom

The International Bible Training Institute (IBTI) is an evangelical, Pentecostal Bible college based in Burgess Hill, West Sussex, United Kingdom. It is a residential college and has been involved with Christian mission work and relief work abroad since it was founded by Fred H. Squire in 1947. The college offers three types of Biblical studies. The current directors are John and Eliana Whyte.

As a Bible college, the IBTI is run as a charity and accredited by ASIC, which lists the IBTI as being one of their “Premiere Colleges”. Two of the study courses in Applied Theology offered by the IBTI are accredited by NCFE.

== History ==
The college was started the college in 1947 by evangelist Fred H. Squire in the aftermath of the Second World War. Squire believed people's biggest need was faith in Jesus Christ. Following the first World Pentecostal Conference organised by the Pentecostal World Fellowship in 1947 in Zürich, Squire began the project. In the same year, the first students from England, Italy, Holland, Indonesia and Switzerland were taken in free of charge for two years.

As the number of students increased annually, in 1947 it moved from Leamington Spa to Hook Place in Burgess Hill where it is still based today. The IBTI became increasingly involved with relief work, in Europe especially during the postwar reconstruction and the Cold War, but later expanding its mission work to countries in Africa and other parts of the world.

Every summer from 1952 to 1999, the IBTI ran a ten-day camp convention to raise awareness for missions and funds for the college, and ministering to hundreds of people who came to IBTI for the occasion.

In 1974, the Field Office of the European Evangelistic Society was located at the IBTI, which later became the Administrative Offices of the AOG Action Europe branch of Missions. Eventually, the whole department of AOG Overseas Missions was based at IBTI, with John P. Wildrianne fulfilling the role as AOG Mission Director for many years. Today the IBTI still cooperates with AOG GB (page/website) as well as other denominations and churches.

During 1976, the IBTI's leaders (John P. Wildrianne and Jean-Jacques Zbinden) established the “Burgess Hill Pentecostal Church” which moved to a different venue in the town centre of Burgess Hill once it grew beyond the capacity of the IBTI chapel. It later became Mid-Sussex Christian Centre and is now called “Centre Church”.

The college is midway through building a new facility which will include new accommodation for students, and provide a hub for networking between students, staff and the community, a larger chapel, and an IT and media room.

== Study courses ==
The IBTI offers three courses in Applied Theology which differ: in duration, the extent of modules covered and the award issued after completion. None of the IBTI awards are for a nationally regulated qualification, they are internal awards. Applied Theology is a sub-field of practical theology.

- Certificate in Applied Theology: The Certificate in Applied Theology is a one-year course combining introductory teaching in theology with opportunities to make first practical steps into Christian ministry. This course is awarded with an IBTI Certificate in Applied Theology when completed.
- Diploma in Applied Theology: This is the two-year course in Applied Theology. In the first year of this course, the modules are identical to the Certificate in Applied Theology course. Students completing this course are awarded an IBTI internal Diploma in Applied Theology and a Certificate of Achievement accredited by NCFE.
- Missional Leadership Course: The Missional Leadership Course is a six months course designed specifically for people who have already been involved in Christian ministry or for non-EU students who can apply for a UK student visitor visa for six months. Some of the second-year modules of the Diploma Course are contained within this course. This study programme is awarded with an IBTI Certificate in Missional Leadership and a Certificate of Achievement in Missional Leadership accredited by NCFE.
