= Hammonds Place =

Building in Burgess Hill, Sussex

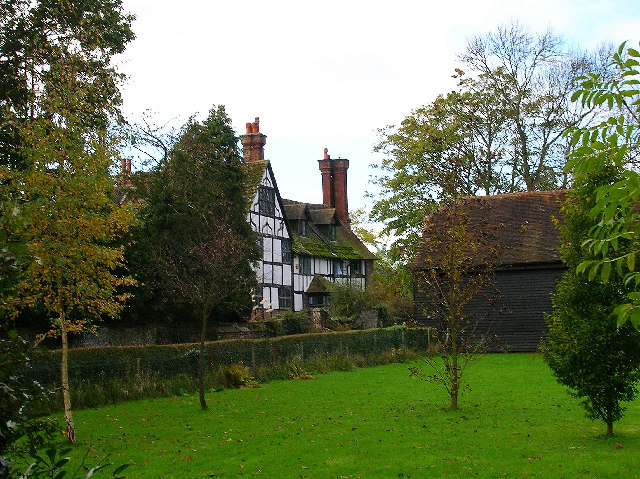
- Hammonds Place, Burgess Hill

General information
- Type: house
- Architectural style: Elizabethan
- Location: Burgess Hill, Sussex, England
- Construction started: 1566

Technical details
- Structural system: Timber frame, brick

Hammonds Place is a Grade II Listed building in Burgess Hill, Sussex. It is an Elizabethan residence which was substantially re-built by the Michelbourne family in 1565, the date engraved on its porch. It was listed Grade II on 22 April 1950.

== History ==
Described by Historic England as "The best building in Burgess Hill", Hammonds Place is a Timber-framed house, with the east front dating to 1566. The house has casement windows, some retaining their original Elizabethan diamond panes of glass. The house has two storeys and an attic, and a number of other historic features. It was listed Grade II on 22 April 1950.

Parts of the house date to the 1400s, and it is believed that Queen Elizabeth I was a guest there.

== See also ==
- Burgess Hill
