= Bedelands Farm Nature Reserve =

Nature reserve in West Sussex, England

Coordinates: 50.972°N 0.123°W

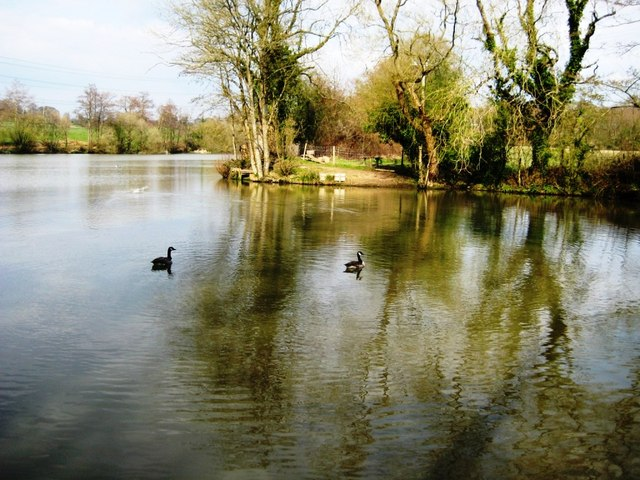
- Interactive map of Bedelands Farm Nature Reserve
- Type: Local Nature Reserve
- Location: Burgess Hill, West Sussex
- OS grid: TQ 319 208
- Area: 35.2 hectares (87 acres)

Bedelands Farm Nature Reserve is a 35.2-hectare (87-acre) Local Nature Reserve on the northern outskirts of Burgess Hill in West Sussex. It is owned and managed by Mid Sussex District Council. It sits within the parish of Ansty and Staplefield. Since 1994, in consultation with the District Council and the University of Sussex, the Friends group have managing the area and for conservation of the flora and fauna and the public’s enjoyment. The Nature Reserve is a Site of Nature Conservation Importance (SNCI) and treasured by the local community. The richness of the area for wildlife is under threat by the encroaching housing developments of the Northern Arc and the pressures dog walking and other activities local housing will bear on the area.

It is best known for its seven archaic flower meadows: Watford Meadow, Wet Meadow, Big Field, House Field, Mill Pond Field, Old Furze Common and Valebridge Common Field. Each has its own different history and character (e.g. TQ 320 210).

Watford Meadow and Wet Meadow lie to the west and have boardwalks. Buttercup and ox-eye daisy dominate visually, but yellow rattle is also abundant. It hosts the scarce grass rivulet moths and dormice and there are rare plants such as ragged robin and sneezewort.

The three eastern meadows were part of Valebridge Common (TQ 321 210) until its enclosure. Dyer's Greenweed is abundant on Valebridge Common Field. In the east of Valebridge Pond (TQ 322 212), amongst the water hemlock, are many insects including cardinal beetles, longhorn beetles, longhorn moths, scorpion flies, snail-killing flies, craneflies, empididea flies, shiny leaf beetles, noble chafer beetles, soldier beetles, dung beetles, Ichneumon wasps, mining bees, damselflies, cuckoo bees, butterflies and moths. Valebridge Meadow was designated a Coronation Meadow in 2013.

Big Wood, Watford Wood, Long Wood, and Leylands Wood also are part of the Nature Reserve. They have many bluebells and other flowers, which host a diverse range of insects and arachnids, including wasp beetle, burnet companion moth, yellow crab spider, cucumber green spider (often near hedges) and a host of others.
