= Burgess Hill Girls =

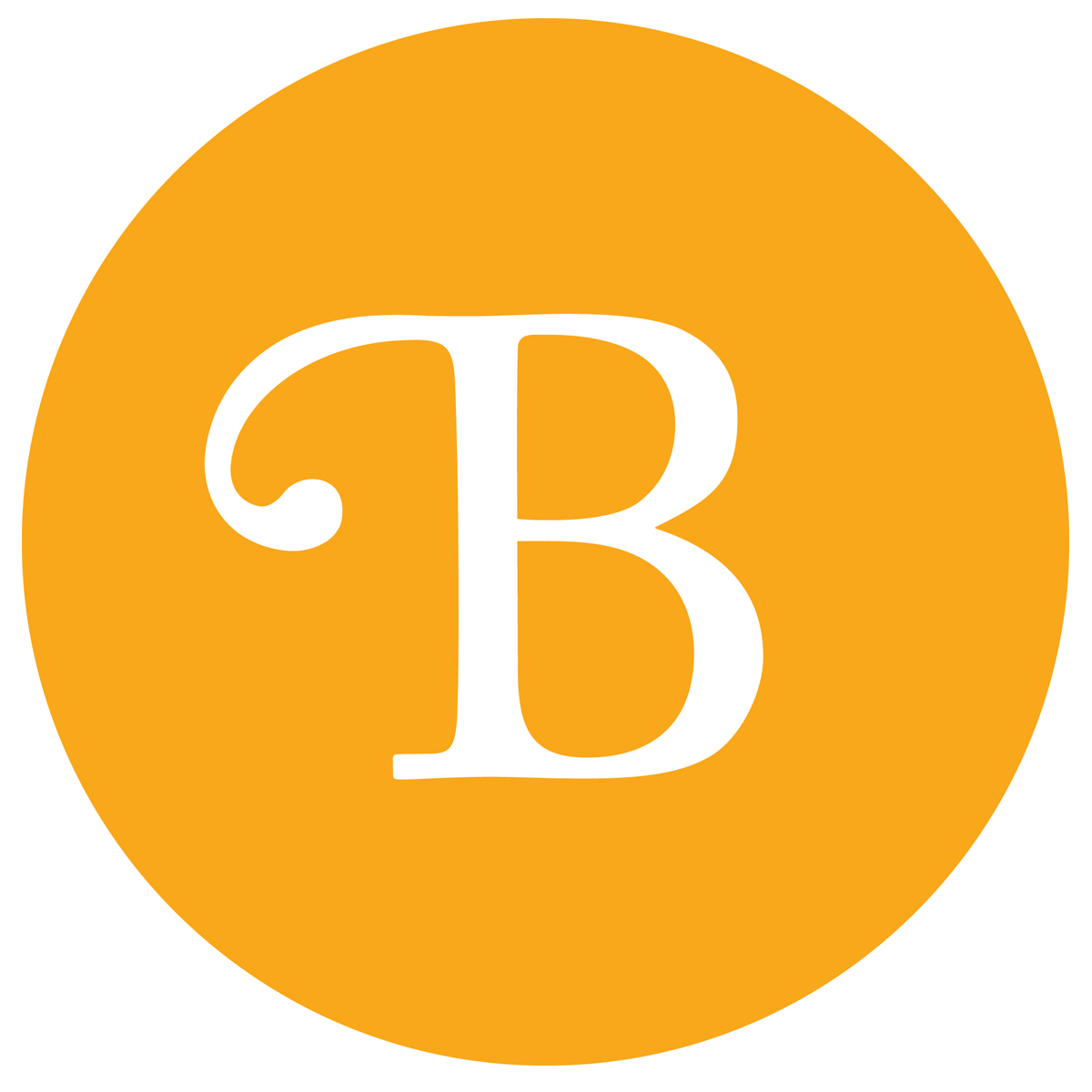

Location
- Keymer Road; Burgess Hill, West Sussex, RH15 0EG; England; 50.9514°N 0.1254°W

Information
- Type: Independent day and boarding
- Motto: I am, I can, I should, I will
- Established: 1906
- Founder: Beatrice Goode
- Local authority: West Sussex
- Chair of Governors: Simon Thorton- Wood
- Head: Heather Cavanagh
- Staff: c.145
- Gender: Girls (boys are accepted at the nursery)
- Age: 2½ to 18
- Enrolment: c.488
- Houses: Pankhurst, Austen, Watson, Williams
- Colours: White, yellow, and navy blue
- Former pupils: Bold Girls
- Former pupils: Bold Girls
- Website: http://www.burgesshillgirls.com/

Burgess Hill Girls (previously named Burgess Hill School for Girls) is an independent, girls-only day and boarding school for girls aged between 2½ and 18 years (full boarding is offered from 11 years), founded in 1906 by Miss Beatrice Goode. The school is located in Burgess Hill, West Sussex, having moved to its present location in 1928. The school also has boys attending the nursery.

== Overview ==
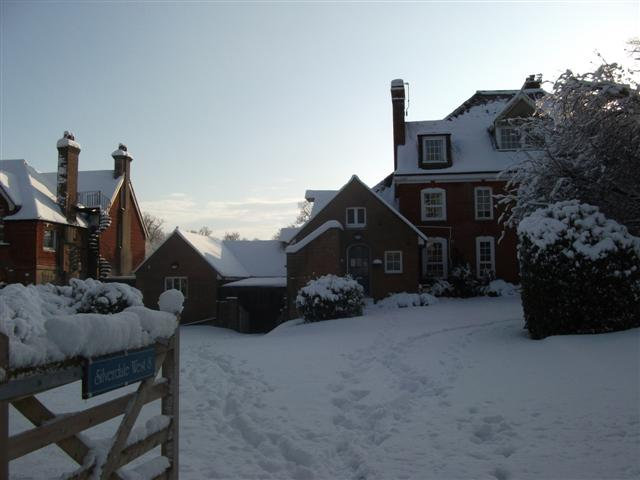
Burgess Hill Girls School, 2010

The multi-building school is situated on Keymer Road, in the West Sussex town of Burgess Hill, and is a five-minute walk from Burgess Hill railway station, which is on the Brighton Main Line. Coaches and minibuses collect girls from outlying areas in Sussex.

The school was last visited in 2023 by the Independent Schools Inspectorate. Both the Senior School and Sixth Form and Prep School and Nursery ISI reports judged the school as “excellent” in all areas. The full reports can be found on the school website.

Mrs Kathryn Bell (Head 2014–2017) took the place of Mrs Ann Aughwane (Head 2006–2014) in 2014. In September 2015, she rebranded the school, changing its logo, colours, and name. The name changed from Burgess Hill School for Girls to Burgess Hill Girls.

After 11 years as Deputy Head, Mrs Liz Laybourn became Head in 2017 until she retired in 2022.

In August 2022, Mr Lars Fox became the new Head of Burgess Hill Girls.

In August 2025, Mrs Heather Cavanagh was appointed as the Head

== Houses ==
Name	House colour	Namesake
Pankhurst	Blue	Emmeline Pankhurst
Austen	Yellow	Jane Austen
Watson	Red	Emma Watson
Williams	Green	Serena Williams

== Notable former pupils ==
- Holly Willoughby, television presenter
- Caroline Atkins, cricketer
- Haydn Gwynne, actor
- Funke Abimbola MBE, general counsel for Roche UK
- Pamela Frankau, novelist
- Greta Scacchi, actor

== Heads ==
- Beatrice Goode (1906–1938)- founder of the school
- Mary Gillies (1938–1955)
- Margaret Morris (1955–1971)
- Doreen Harford (1971–1979)
- Barbara Webb (1979–1992)
- Rosemary Lewis (1992–2001)
- Susan Gorham (2001–2005)
- Ann Aughwane (2006–2014)
- Kathryn Bell (2014–2017)
- Liz Laybourn (2017–2022)
- Lars Fox (2022–2024)
- Heather Cavanagh (2024 -)
