= Jacob's Post =

Coordinates: 50.9618°N 0.0940°W

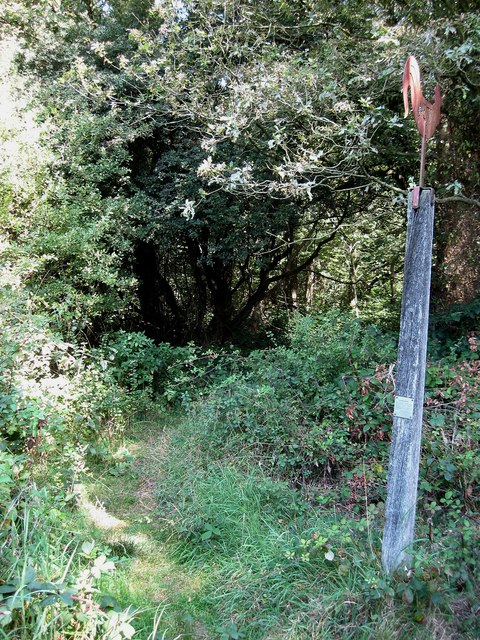
- Jacob's Post

- Location within East Sussex
- District: Lewes
- Shire county: East Sussex
- Region: South East
- Country: England
- Sovereign state: United Kingdom
- Police: Sussex
- Fire: East Sussex
- Ambulance: South East Coast

Jacob's Post is a post outside the old Royal Oak pub just inside the north of Ditchling Common to the east of Burgess Hill, in Lewes district, East Sussex, England. The pub abutted the turnpike Toll Gate which was still shown on OS maps up to 1897.

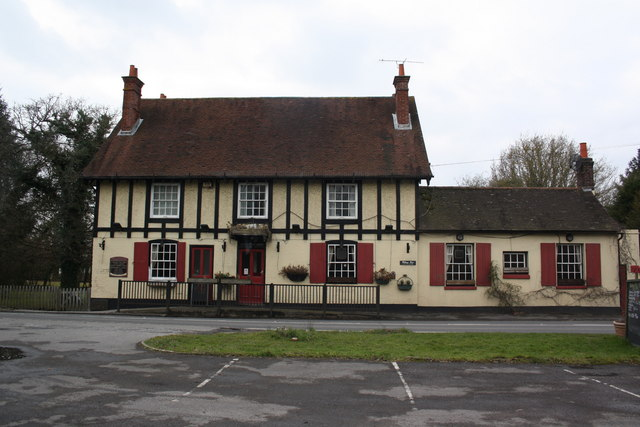
The Royal Oak, Jacob's Post

It is named after a traveling peddler named Jacob Harris (also known by his Jewish name of Yacob Hirsch) who in 1734, according to local lore, killed the landlord of the Royal Oak pub's wife and a serving maid. He also slashed the landlord in the throat but he survived. After stealing a coat worth ten shillings, Jacob Harris ran north to Turners Hill and stayed at the Cat Inn. The landlord managed to round a party of searchers for Jacob that included soldiers and discovered him at Selsfield House hiding in the chimney by inadvertently flushing him out when they lit the fire. Harris was prosecuted and executed for his crime at Horsham gaol and his body was returned to hang in a gibbet at the northern end of Ditchling Common next to the highway and near the scene of his crime.

The post where he hung took on a life of its own as people believed infertility and other ailments could be cured by touching the post. If you got a splinter from the post it was said you would never get toothache. Consequently people took small pieces of the post when visiting. This continued well into the 19th century despite the original post being replaced by another.

A number of ballads have been written about the event. The next recorded Jew in the Brighton area was in 1766.

The post used to be visible from the road but the Common here has returned to scrub and has to be accessed via a track that starts from the farm drive or nearby Bankside Farm. The post itself has a metal bird nailed to the top. The Royal Oak pub was demolished for housing in 2017.
