= Burgess Hill =

Town and parish in West Sussex, England

Coordinates: 50.9535°N 0.1262°W

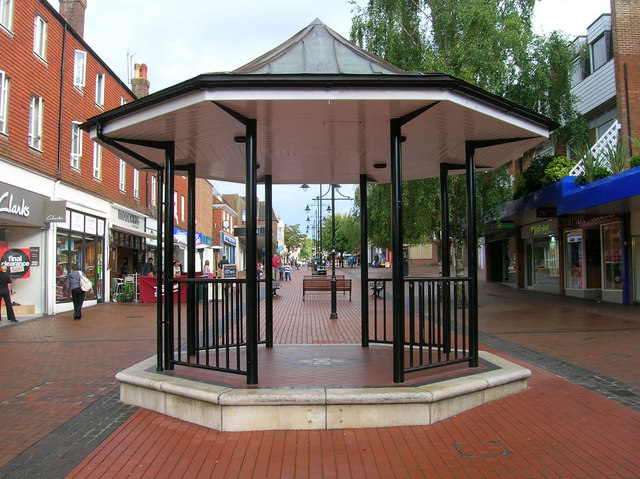
- Looking up Church Walk, a pedestrianised shopping area

- Location within
- Area: 9.47 km^{2} (3.66 sq mi)
- Population: 30,635 2011 census
  - Density: 3,042/km^{2} (7,880/sq mi)
- OS grid reference: TQ317187
  - London: 62 km (39 mi) N
- Civil parish: Burgess Hill
- District: Mid Sussex, Lewes
- Shire county: West Sussex, East Sussex
- Region: South East
- Country: England
- Sovereign state: United Kingdom
- Post town: BURGESS HILL
- Postcode district: RH15
- Dialling code: 01444
- UK Parliament: Mid Sussex, East Grinstead & Uckfield
- Website: Town Council

Burgess Hill (/ˌbɜːrdʒəs ˈhɪl/) is a town and civil parish in West Sussex, England, close to the border with East Sussex, on the edge of the South Downs National Park, 39 mi (63 km) south of London, 10 mi (16 km) north of Brighton and Hove, and 29 mi (47 km) northeast of the county town, Chichester. It had an area of 3.7 sq mi (9.6 km^{2}) and a population of 30,635 at the 2011 Census, making it the fourth most populous parish in the county (behind Crawley, Worthing and Horsham) and the most populous in the Mid Sussex District. Other nearby towns include Haywards Heath to the northeast and Lewes, the county town of East Sussex, to the southeast.

Burgess Hill is just on the West Sussex side of the border dividing the two counties, although parts of the World's End district are across the county boundary in the Lewes district of East Sussex. On its northwest border lies the Bedelands Farm Nature Reserve.

Burgess Hill is twinned with Schmallenberg in Germany and Abbeville in France.

== History ==
=== Early history ===
The London to Brighton Way was built connecting London to the South coast and passing through what is now Burgess Hill, and although a Roman road, there is no evidence that the Romans settled there.

Burgess Hill originated in the parishes of Clayton, Keymer, and Ditchling – all of them mentioned in the Domesday Book. The town's name comes from the Burgeys family when the name John Burgeys appeared in the tax rolls. The name of Burgeys stood for 'bourgeois', the inhabitant of a borough. By the Elizabethan period, a community had established itself there, and many buildings dating from this era still stand.

The hill in the town's name is taken to mean different things to different people. Many believe that the hill in question is the hill on which the railway station currently stands, but there is a Burgess Farm on a hill in the south-east of the town, in Folders Lane. Whether this is the hill referred to in the town's name is not known.

The few buildings in the area were the two farmhouses, at Hammonds Ridge (still standing as a residence) and one at Queen's Crescent, in the west of what is now Burgess Hill. Until the nineteenth century, however, the town was known as St John's Common, and much of what is now the town centre was common land used by the tenants of Clayton and Keymer manors for grazing and as a source of fuel. Buildings which supported the common land were the King's Head pub (now demolished), a blacksmith's forge, and several cottages.

From the fourteenth century or earlier, the annual Midsummer Fair was held on this common land on 24 June, the feast of the birth of St John the Baptist. The last such sheep and lamb fair was held in 1913.

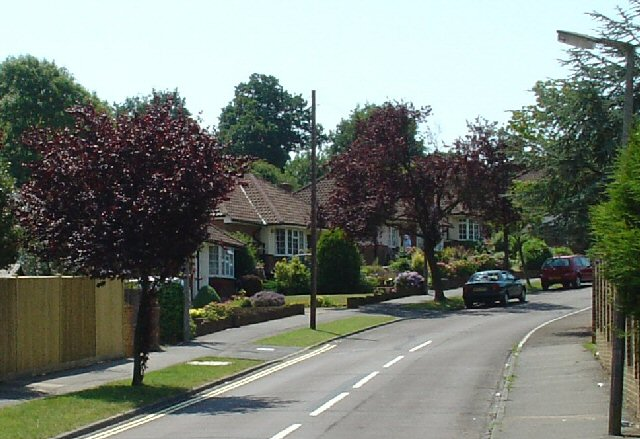
Noel Rise, part of a 1950s housing development in the town

With the development of the London to Brighton mainline railway, those in the business soon realised that transporting sheep by train was more cost effective and easier than using the old roadways. Most livestock trading began to centre on railside markets such as those at Hassocks, Haywards Heath, and Lewes railway stations. By the dawn of the 20th century, livestock trading had all but ceased in the Burgess Hill area.

=== 1700 to 1900 ===
By the early seventeenth century small scale brick and tile manufacture was flourishing and during this time parcels of common land were allocated for house building and small businesses. By the early eighteenth century brick making had been extended and four shops and one or two alehouses established on the common. Craftsmen such as smiths, shoemakers and weavers also worked there. Brickmaking by hand was still undertaken until very recently, by Keymer Tiles (formerly the Keymer Brick and Tile Company) whose tiles can be found in buildings such as St. James Church, Piccadilly and Manchester Central Station (now G-Mex).

The arrival of the London and Brighton Railway in the 1840s (the line was officially opened to Brighton from Haywards Heath on 21 September 1841) was an important milestone in the Town's history and development, despite the station remaining a request stop on the route for a number of years after opening. The influx of trades associated with railway construction and operation, including many navvies changed the demography of the town. The Railway Tavern in Station Road was constructed to provide accommodation for all who needed it on Railway business. The arrival of the railway shaped the traffic pattern of the Town and continues to this day; all road traffic has to cross the line either in the South on Station Road or in the North on Leylands Road. The opening of the Lewes Branch connected the Keymer Brick and Tile Company to the railway network providing access to greater markets. Wivelsfield railway station was originally built nearby on the Lewes branch.

The arrival of the railway and the proximity of Burgess Hill to Brighton, itself expanding as a result of the arrival of the railway, led to an influx of professional people looking for places to live. Not far from the station, the common was ripe for development with the result that the Keymer and Clayton portions were enclosed in 1828 and 1855 respectively. Between 1850 and 1880 the area changed from an insignificant rural settlement to a town of 4,500 residents.

In 1857, in an area now known as either 'the top of the town', or Hoadley's Corner, the Hoadley family of Heathfield established a large department store, of which the original building still stands, on the corner of Station Road and Junction Road. This successful business also had branches at nearby Ditchling, and Seaford too, but it was in Burgess Hill that the head offices were based.

In 1876, a large house known as Wynnstay was constructed opposite Hoadley's store in Junction Road, and became the principal residence of Sampson Copestake. Copestake later provided land and money and to build a new Church in World's End, which later became the parish of St Andrew's in its own right.

Wynnstay eventually became the Wynnstay Hydropathic Institution, known as the Hydro for short. The property was bought up and converted by a Professor Weidhaus when Copestake moved on, and converted to a nature cure establishment. It is thought that the views from the property, along with the fresh country air and proximity to Burgess Hill railway station, were the reasons for this enterprise. The Hydro remained until 1909, when the business was moved to Franklands, a large property to the south of the town. By 1914 Wynnstay had become a hotel and by the 1950s it was known as St Joseph's Convent and became a convent and school for Catholic children.

In 1897 the Victoria Pleasure Gardens were opened by local household name Edwin Street, a well-known farmer and butcher. The gardens were opened in honour of Queen Victoria's Diamond Jubilee, and contained a large lake, which covered 3 acres (12,000 m^{2}), and what can only be described as a small early version of a roller coaster, known as a switchback (an alternative general term for a roller coaster). The lake was used for boating in the summer, and skating in the winter. The frozen lake was always tested by Mr Street, a man of 23 stone, before being used in the winter. This area is now the Victoria Business Park, an industrial estate, where one of Burgess Hills oldest retailers Park Cameras is now located.

=== 1900 to present day ===
On 12 July 1944 a Royal Air Force Supermarine Spitfire fighter crashed at Greenlands Farm, off the Keymer Road, killing the Belgian pilot.

The town continued to grow, experiencing its largest population increase between the years of 1951 and 1961, when the population of about 7,000 residents almost doubled. This earned Burgess Hill the title of fastest growing town in the South East. By 1956, the Victoria Industrial Estate was completed, and has since expanded. It now contains the British headquarters of two substantial international companies. In 1986 a smaller industrial estate in the North of the town developed, known as Sheddingdean Industrial Estate. Both Sheddingdean and Victoria have now been renamed as business parks.

In the seventies and eighties several new housing estates were built, namely the Folders Lane estate (formerly known as Oakwood), the Oak Hall Park estate and the Sheddingdean estate. The 1980s saw the largest single development in the town's history; new housing was created in the northwest of the town with a development known as West End Meadows. Along with this a link road to the A23 was built, easing traffic on the previous route along Gatehouse Lane and Jobs Lane.

Bedelands Farm Nature Reserve to the northwest was designated a Local Nature Reserve (LNR) at around this time, preserving at least this area from the otherwise relentless building, but further development took place to the South and West of the Town in the early 1990s. This became the Hammonds Ridge estate (known colloquially as the 'Tesco estate' due to its proximity to the supermarket) which was built at the time.

The Triangle, a large leisure and conference centre, was built in the Northwest of the town and opened by the Queen in 1999. In 2005 St Paul's Catholic College moved from Haywards Heath to their new site opposite the Triangle.

In 2004 Mid-Sussex District Council announced the Burgess Hill Master Plan, a scheme arranged with Thornfield Properties plc to massively redevelop Burgess Hill Town Centre. The Master Plan was part of a larger scheme that would have seen the redevelopment of Haywards Heath and East Grinstead town centres.

The plan would result in the complete reconstruction of most of the town centre, and the redevelopment of the Victorian era train station. However early in 2010 Thornfield Properties was reported to be in financial difficulties and ultimately the scheme did not move forward. Many of the proposed changes were included by New River Retail in their redevelopment plans for the town centre.

As well as the aforementioned developments, there have been two more housing estates built in the town – one in the town's north east, and the other in the area known as Folders Meadow in the east.

Some of the areas currently being developed are the old Keymer Tileworks and around the south east off Folders Lane. Almost 1,000 houses will be built on these sites over the next few years.

=== Future of the town ===
Mid Sussex District Council put forward its master plan for the development of the town in 2006. The town approved its Neighbourhood Plan in 2015. With the proposed housing quota for the area high, it is expected to grow further in the 21st century, and new housing will be created in the town centre in the form of flats as a result of the redevelopment plans put forward by New River Retail and for which planning has been approved. Town centre development includes the redevelopment of the Martlets Shopping Centre to add a ten-screen cinema complex, hotel, new shops and parking. The gasometer in Leylands Road has been removed and replaced with a Lidl supermarket.

The town is set for the development of 3,500 new houses as part of the Northern Arc development. Three schools as well as community facilities will be included and the planning of the development is at an advanced stage with the county, district and town councils working together to finalise this development, which is being promoted by the government's housing agency Homes England. In addition a science park and industrial park are planned along the A2300.

== Governance ==
Burgess Hill is in the constituency of Mid Sussex. The Member of Parliament representing Mid Sussex is currently Alison Bennett, elected in the 2024 General Election. Bennett succeeded Mims Davies, who was first elected during the December 2019 election. It was in the historic county of Sussex, and in 1974 swapped from the administrative county of East Sussex to the shire county of West Sussex, under the Local Government Act 1972.

A small residential area in the northeast of the town, as well as land which may be developed for housing in the future, lie on the East Sussex side of the county boundary, which otherwise runs beyond the eastern edge of the urban area. Both Mid Sussex District Council and Lewes District Council, under whose control this area falls, have raised concerns that planning decisions made at a regional level do not take it into account properly.

=== Town Council ===
Following the enactment of the West Sussex (Electoral Changes) Order 2016, Burgess Hill is divided into ten different wards; the most of any settlement in Mid Sussex. These wards (with numbers of councillors representing each denoted in parentheses) are Dunstall (1), Gatehouse (1), Franklands (3), Hammonds (1), Leylands (3), Meeds (2), Norman (1), St Johns (1), St Andrews (3) and Victoria (2). A total of eighteen councillors represent the town of Burgess Hill and its surroundings. As of May 2019, a majority of eleven councillors are representatives of the Liberal Democrat Party. They are followed by four councillors from the Green Party. The Leader of the Town Council is Councillor Robert Eggleston and the Town Mayor is Councillor Roger Cartwright.

=== District Council ===
From each of the six wards, two councillors are elected to represent their ward in the District Council. 7 are Liberal Democrat, 2 are Green, 2 are Conservative and 1 sits as an independent, The representatives for Burgess Hill residents whose homes lie within the Lewes district are Conservative.

=== County Council ===
Burgess Hill is split into three electoral divisions that send representatives to West Sussex County Council; Burgess Hill North and Burgess Hill East, and Hassocks & Burgess Hill South, which covers the villages of Clayton, Hassocks and Keymer as well as the Victoria town council ward of Burgess Hill. Three councillors in total were elected to represent the three divisions in the West Sussex county council, all of whom are Liberal Democrats. The part of Burgess Hill in East Sussex, which lies in the Chailey electoral division, is also represented by a Liberal Democrat at the county level.

== Geography ==
Burgess Hill is situated in the Sussex Weald, 10 miles (16 km) north of Brighton, and about 4.5 miles (7.2 km) south of Haywards Heath. Lewes, in East Sussex, is 12 miles (19 km) southeast of Burgess Hill, and the larger town of Horsham is 15 miles (24 km) to the northwest. Crawley, a major settlement, is 13 miles (21 km) to the north, and Gatwick Airport is 16 miles (26 km) in the same direction.

The amenities and shopping services in Burgess Hill are also well used by the surrounding villages. The larger villages of Hassocks and Hurstpierpoint are 5 to 10 minutes' drive away from the town centre, to the south and southwest respectively. Albourne, Ansty, Bolney, Clayton, Ditchling, Ditchling Common, East Chiltington, Goddards Green, Hickstead, Jacob's Post, Keymer, Plumpton, Plumpton Green, Sayers Common, Streat, Twineham, Westmeston, Wivelsfield (which has given its name to a railway station in Burgess Hill), and Wivelsfield Green are other nearby villages.

One of the tributaries of the River Adur weaves its way through the town, known locally as Hambrook. The town is a nuclear settlement, radiating out from the centre, curbed on the western side by the ring road, and on the east side by the East/West Sussex border (although some development on the eastern side of the town, particularly in the northeast, is in Lewes District) and by Ditchling common.

The northeastern side of the town (which includes Wivelsfield railway station) is known as World's End.

=== Nearest towns ===
- Wivelsfield
- Haywards Heath
- Hurstpierpoint
- Hassocks
- Brighton

=== Climate ===
Burgess Hill experiences an oceanic climate (Köppen climate classification Cfb) similar to almost all of the United Kingdom.

== Economy ==
=== National and international ===
Burgess Hill is home to the offices of many national and international companies, many based at one of the four business parks in and around the town, organised by the Burgess Hill Business Parks Association. Altogether the Business Parks Association, representing about 200 companies, employs approximately 8000 people, with a combined yearly turnover of 2 billion pounds. Victoria Business Park is the larger of the two parks in the town, to the south west, with the smaller Sheddingdean Business Park to the north. The town's residents may also commute to Ditchling Common Industrial Estate, another small business park just over the county border, or the Bolney Business Park, located off the A2300 between Burgess Hill and Hickstead. Both of these are also associated with the aforementioned organisation.

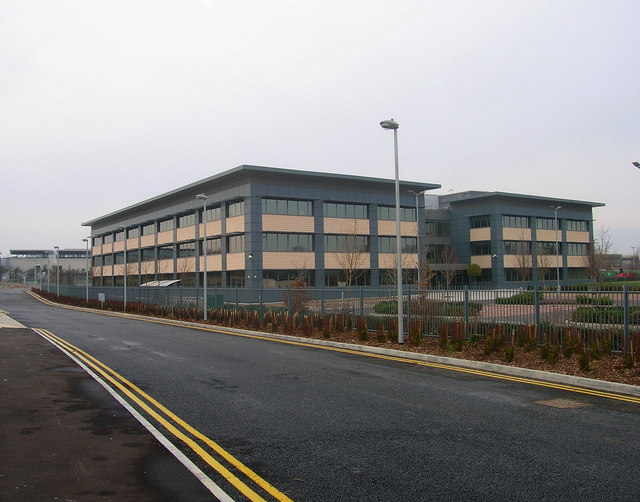
Hoffmann-La Roche offices in Victoria Business Park

Filofax has its UK headquarters in the town, Technetix has its global headquarters in the town, and Roche's offices in Burgess Hill are the UK diagnostics headquarters. American Express, CAE, Honeywell, Porsche and Collins Aerospace also all have offices in the town. Almost half of those employed in Burgess Hill's are residents of the town. Many residents commute to nearby towns such as Horsham, Lewes or Haywards Heath, where 11% of Burgess Hill's population work, or larger employment centres like Crawley and Gatwick (11%), London (8%) or Brighton and Hove (7%). Similarly, people from surrounding villages and towns commute into Burgess Hill, particularly Brighton and Hove, where 14% of Burgess Hill's workers come from, Haywards Heath (5%) and Hassocks (3%).

=== Local ===
The town has two shopping centres, the Market Place and the Martlets as well as shops in Church Road, Church Walk, Cyprus Road, Junction Road, Keymer Road, London Road, Lower Church Road, Mill Road, and Station Road. There are several local commercial districts around the town, at Maple Drive, World's End, Weald Road and Sussex Way.

== Historic buildings ==
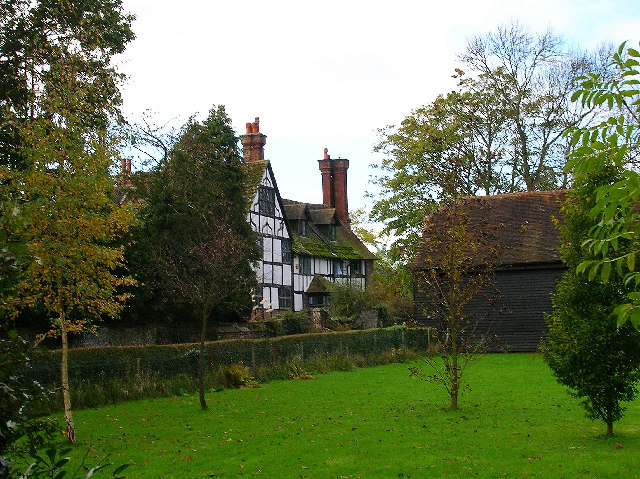
Hammonds Place farmhouse

Hammonds Place, to the west of London Road as it leaves the town to the south, is a handsome Elizabethan residence which was substantially re-built by the Michelbourne family in 1565, the date engraved on its porch. Part of a structure dating from about 1500 was retained with the house. Grove Farm House, just south of Station Road, can be dated to about 1600 and was built about the same time as Farthings in Keymer Road.

Chapel Farm House and Walnut Tree Cottages on Fairplace Hill are on medieval sites and the present buildings date from the late Tudor period, as do Pollards Farm and Freckborough Manor House on the eastern boundary of the town.

High Chimneys in Keymer Road is a handsome farmhouse once called Woodwards, Fowles Farm, a 17th-century dwelling is now called Old Timbers and West End Farm is now the Woolpack Pub. They were all built, or, more correctly, rebuilt, in the 17th and early 18th centuries. The farm from which the town derives its name, referred to as Burgeshill Land in the 16th century, is now the site of the Burgess Hill Academy and the Chanctonbury Estate. The farmhouse itself is long demolished.

Almost all the Victorian detached houses and workmen's terraced cottages built in the second half of the nineteenth century (when the town was renowned as a health resort) have survived.

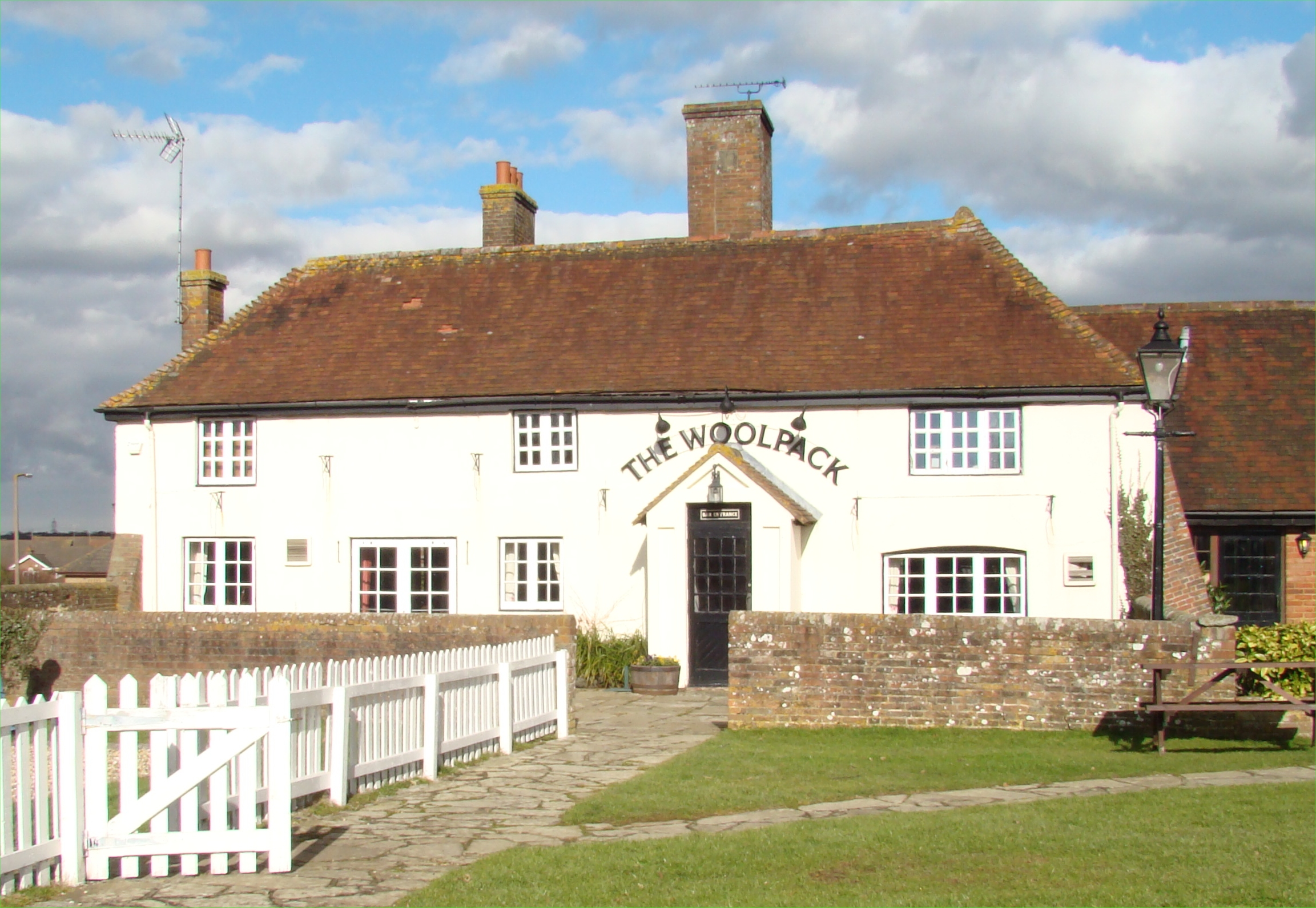
The Woolpack, formerly West End farmhouse

== Transport ==
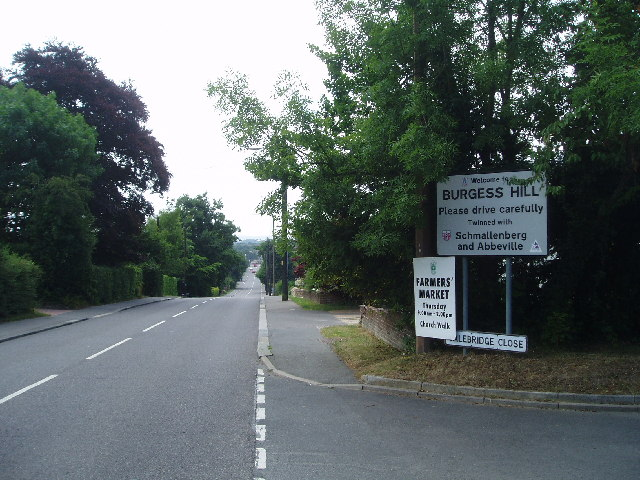
The B2036 looking south into Burgess Hill

Road: In 1770 the road from Cuckfield to Brighton across St John's Common was turnpiked. The A23 is the London-Brighton Trunk road and runs to the west of the town and is largely a high quality dual carriageway. The A23 is connected to Burgess Hill via the A2300 which was built as a single carriageway road in the 1990s, and widened in 2021 to a dual carriageway. The A273 runs along the former turnpike connecting to Pyecombe on the A23 to the south and Haywards Heath on the A272 to the North, it follows the course of Jane Murray Way, directing traffic around the town centre. The A272 road runs north of Burgess Hill, from Winchester to near Uckfield. The B2112 runs east of Burgess Hill, going north–south, and both the B2036 and the B2113 pass through the town heading north–south and west–east respectively.

Bus services: Compass Travel operate a number of bus services across Burgess Hill, and to surrounding towns and villages. Compass runs the current town service, the 35A & 35C (Clockwise and Anti-Clockwise) They also operate other services, serving other towns and villages, including service 33 which runs from Hurstpierpoint to Haywards Heath via Burgess Hill, the 100 which runs to Horsham via Henfield, Steyning, Storrington, Pulborough, Billingshurst and Slinfold before arriving into Horsham. They also run the 167 and 168 "Village Rider" services, running only a couple of times a week in some cases, serving Hassocks, Ditchling, and Plumpton, with the 167 continuing to Lewes and the 168 returning to Burgess Hill in a loop.

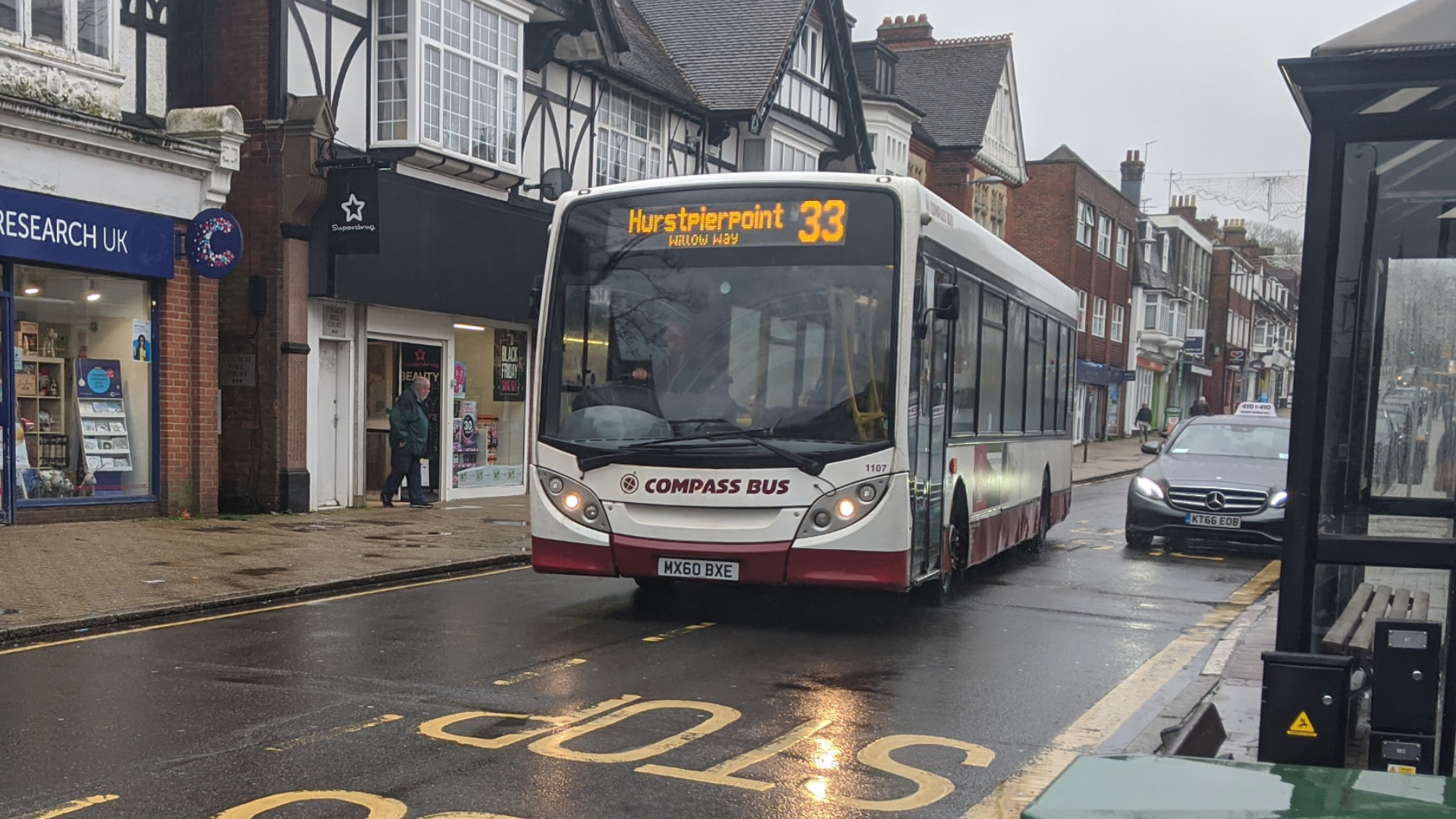
A Compass Bus ADL Enviro 200 10.8m seen on the 33 at Burgess Hill Church Road bus stop

Metrobus operate three services in Burgess, with the 270, 271 and 272 all heading to Brighton southbound, with the 270 running to Churchill Square and the 271 and 272 running to the Royal Sussex County Hospital. Northbound, the 270 runs through Haywards Heath, Lindfield, Horsted Keynes and Danehilll before arriving at East Grinstead Station. This service connects to the Bluebell Railway. The 271 and 272 both run to Crawley, the 271 via Haywards Heath, Cuckfield, Staplefield and Handcross, while the 272 runs via Haywards Heath, Lindfield, Ardingly and Turners Hill.

Railway: The opening of the London to Brighton railway in 1841 triggered a further expansion of the town, although Burgess Hill railway station was for many years a request stop and not a regular station. In 1877 the present station replaced the original one; some of the former buildings remain, however. Wivelsfield railway station serves the north end of Burgess Hill and was opened in 1886. Thameslink and Southern provide regular train services towards London and Brighton from both Burgess Hill stations. In addition, from Burgess Hill, one can travel on the branch of the West Coastway Line to Worthing, Littlehampton and Portsmouth, and from Wivelsfield, one can travel on a branch of the East Coastway Line towards Hastings.

== Education ==
=== Primary education ===
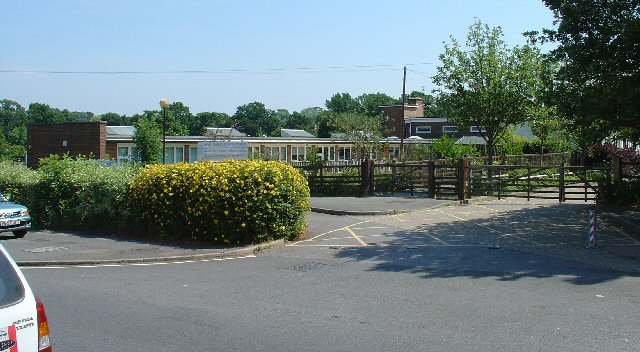
Manor Field Primary School

- Birchwood Grove CP School
- Burgess Hill Girls
- The Gattons Infant School
- London Meed Community Primary School
- Oak Tree Primary School (formerly known as Manor Field Primary School)
- Woodlands Meed School
- Sheddingdean Primary School
- Southway Junior School
- St Peter's School (closed 2008)
- St Wilfrid's Catholic Primary School

=== Secondary education ===
- The Burgess Hill Academy
- Burgess Hill Pupil Referral Unit
- Burgess Hill Girls
- St Paul's Catholic College

Burgess Hill is also served by Downlands Community School in nearby Hassocks, Warden Park Secondary Academy in Cuckfield and Oathall Community College in Haywards Heath.

=== Further education ===
- Burgess Hill Adult Education Centre
- Burgess Hill Girls (Sixth Form)
- St Paul's Catholic College (Sixth Form)

== Religion ==
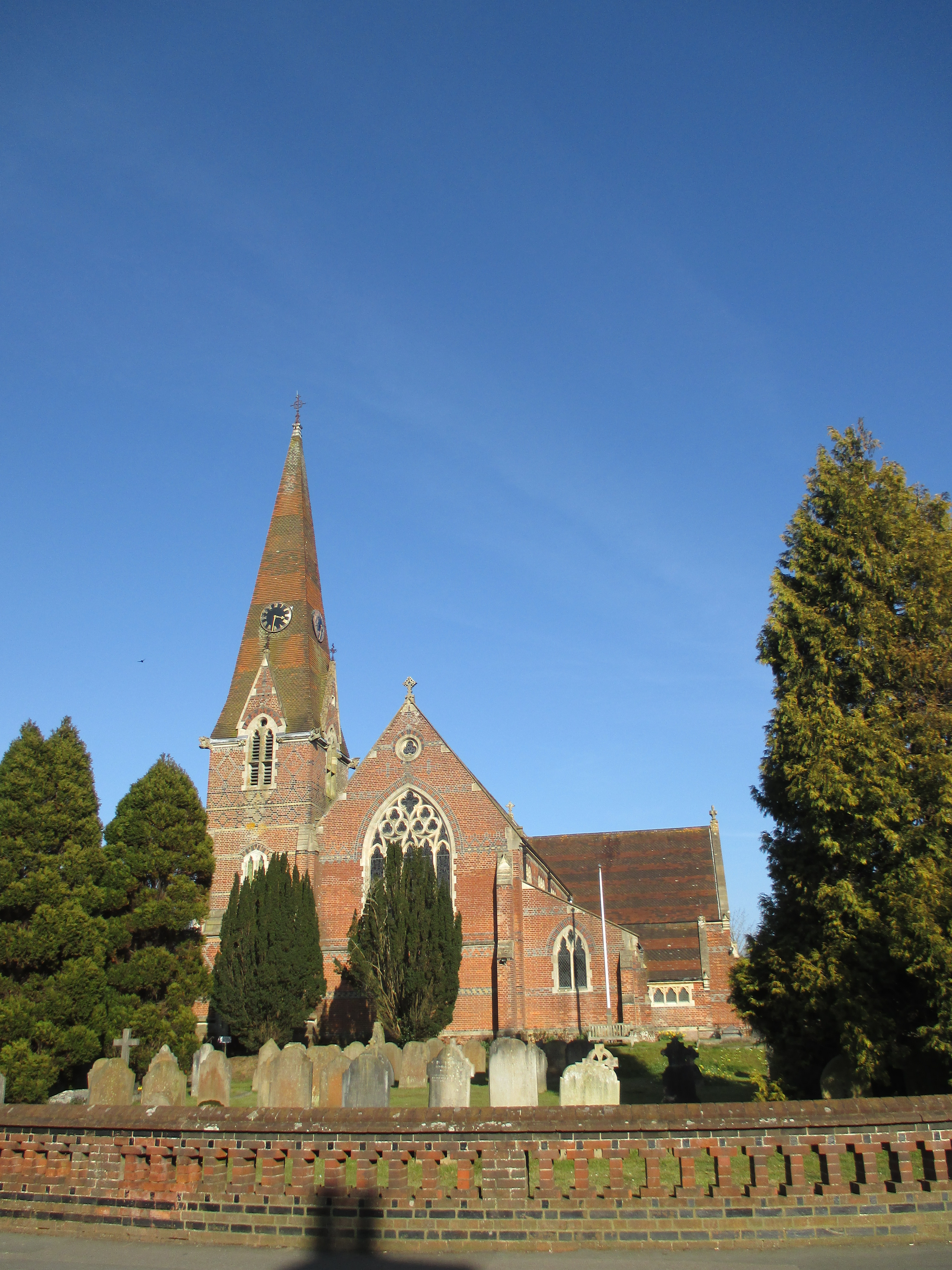
St John the Evangelist's Church

There are several churches in Burgess Hill, including:

- All Saints United Reformed Church
- Burgess Hill (Gateway) Baptist Church
- Methodist Church
- Centre Church Burgess Hill (fka Mid-Sussex Christian Centre)
- Sheddingdean Baptist Church
- St Andrew's Church (Anglican)
- St Edward's Church (Anglican)
- St John the Evangelist's Church (the Anglican parish church)
- St Wilfrid's Church, Roman Catholic
- The King's Church (Newfrontiers)
- The Point Fresh Expression Church (Anglican)

Burgess Hill is also home to the International Bible Training Institute which founded Mid-Sussex Christian Centre, formally Burgess Hill Pentecostal Church.

Providence Strict Baptist Chapel, one of many former Strict Baptist chapels in Sussex, closed in 1999 after 124 years of religious use. The Grade II-listed Neoclassical building was designed by Simeon Norman in 1875.

== Recreation and wild areas ==
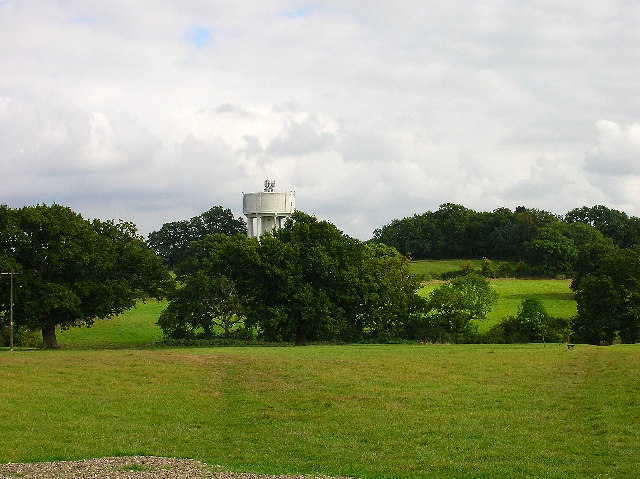
Water tower in Batchelors Farm Nature Reserve, Burgess Hill

To the northwest of Burgess Hill is Bedelands Farm Nature Reserve and to the east is Ditchling Common Country Park, a 188-acre (0.76 km^{2}) area of common land, designated in 1975. In the town centre, the largest park is St. John's Park. The Triangle leisure centre on the northern edge of the town is run by Places Leisure. Replacing the lido in St. Johns Park, the Triangle is also used for conferences. The Triangle was opened by Queen Elizabeth II in 1999.

Burgess Hill retains an independent cinema. The Orion Cinema, opened in 1928, has two screens and shows a mixture of mainstream and arthouse films. There is also a local theatre, which puts on productions quarter-yearly, the most popular of these being a pantomime, performed in the Martlets Hall. Musical theatre productions by Burgess Hill Musical Theatre Society (formerly Burgess Hill Operatic Society) are also held at the Martlets Hall. (Martlets Hall demolished Jan 2020)

The town is also home to the Mid Sussex Brass Band which has a second section contesting main band and a thriving youth band. As well as supporting local fetes and concerts, the band plays at concerts throughout the year in venues from Horsham to Hever Castle, and travels to Schmallenberg, Burgess Hill's German twin town, for the Schmallenberger Woche.

Burgess Hill has a Symphony Orchestra, which draws its members from Burgess Hill and the surrounding area. The Orchestra puts on two classical concerts each year, normally in May and November. Burgess Hill Choral Society perform two concerts every year, shortly before Christmas and in April or May.

== Sport ==
Burgess Hill Town Football Club plays football in the Isthmian League Premier Division, the seventh tier of English football. The club plays its home games at Leylands Park.

Burgess Hill Rugby Football Club, or The Sussex All Blacks, are the local Rugby Football club, playing in Sussex RFU 1. Their home games are played at Poveys Close. Burgess Hill also has a baseball team playing in the British AAA league.

Burgess Hill has two major cricket clubs, St Andrew's CC and Burgess Hill CC. St Andrew's Cricket Club have four adult teams for both men and women and have a juniors section as well. Their home ground is at Sidney West on Leylands Road where they have been playing for over 100 years. Burgess Hill Cricket Club have four adult teams and a youth section and play at St. Johns Park.

Mid Sussex Hockey Club play their home games at The Triangle leisure centre, although their clubhouse is based in Haywards Heath.

Mid Sussex Youth Netball Club train at The Triangle and have many successful teams. The Triangle leisure centre was the home venue of Brighton Bears, a former basketball team. The franchise folded in 2006.

Several local pubs and social clubs enter teams into the Mid Sussex Pool League, although any venue with 10 miles (16 km) of "The Duck" in Haywards Heath can apply to join. The league plays World Eight Ball Rules.

A squash club plays at The Triangle every Saturday and Monday, and has a team that plays in the East Sussex County League.

A running club meet at the Burgess Hill School for Girls every Wednesday evening. Members compete in local and national charity and fun races.

The skate park in the centre of town provides sporting opportunities, and holds an annual competition.

The Triangle was one of the venues in the South East supporting the London 2012 Olympic Games, and served as a base and training centre for teams from around the world.

== Local media ==
Television signals are received from either the Heathfield or Midhurst TV transmitters.

Local radio stations are BBC Radio Sussex on 104.8 FM, Heart South on 102.4 FM, More Radio Mid-Sussex on 106.4 FM and Mid Sussex Radio on 103.8 FM, a community radio station.

The town’s local newspapers are the Mid Sussex Times and The Sussex Newspaper.

== Town twinning ==
Burgess Hill's twin towns are:

- Abbeville, Picardy – France
- Schmallenberg, North Rhine-Westphalia – Germany

A square in Schmallenberg has been named Burgess Hill Platz.

== Notable people ==
- Caroline Atkins, cricketer; born in the town
- Elizabeth Bartlett, poet; born in Deal, Kent, spent much of her life at her house in Burgess Hill
- Neil Brand, writer, composer and silent film accompanist; born in Burgess Hill
- Valentine Dyall, voice actor; lived in Station Roa
- Quentin Edwards, judge; lived here after returning from Egypt
- Colin Griffiths, TV presenter
- Henry George Bonavia Hunt, clergyman; lived his final years here and is buried here
- Vallance Jupp, cricketer; born in the town
- Martha Kearney, journalist and broadcaster; educated at St Wilfrids RC School
- Greg Luer, footballer who played at Burgess Hill Town F.C. before moving to Hull City
- Richard Midgley, professional basketball player.
- Simon Nye, TV writer; born in Burgess Hill
- Guy Stair Sainty, author and art dealer; born at Clayton Priory on what is now the southern edge of the town
- Holly Willoughby, television presenter; was educated at Burgess Hill School
- Michael York, actor; raised in the town
- Bobby Zamora, the professional footballer, lived in the town whilst playing for Brighton & Hove Albion

== Culture ==
The town was referred to by poet laureate John Betjeman in the following lines:

I am a young executive. No cuffs than mine are cleaner;
I have a Slimline brief-case and I use the firm's Cortina.
In every roadside hostelry from here to Burgess Hill
The maîtres d'hôtel all know me well, and let me sign the bill.

From "Executive" in A Nip in the Air (1974).
