= Coronation Meadows =

British nature conservation scheme

The Coronation Meadows project is a British nature conservation scheme supported by Charles, Prince of Wales. It aimed to create 60 wildflower meadows to celebrate 60 years since the coronation of Elizabeth II.

It is led by Plantlife, along with The Wildlife Trusts and the Rare Breeds Survival Trust. Prince Charles has said that he was inspired to set up the scheme after he read Plantlife's 2012 report Our Vanishing Flora and "fully appreciated just how many wildflower meadows had been lost over the past 60 years". The scheme was supported in 2014-2016 by a Biffa Award grant of £1m. A Coronation Meadow was established at Wakehurst Place in 2016, using seed from Bedelands Farm Nature Reserve in West Sussex. The 90th meadow was established in 2016 as The Queen's Meadow within London's Green Park.

In 2021 the Wildflower Press published Wildflowers for the Queen: A Visual Celebration of Britain's Coronation Meadows (ISBN 978-1527249592), photographed by Hugo Rittson-Thomas.

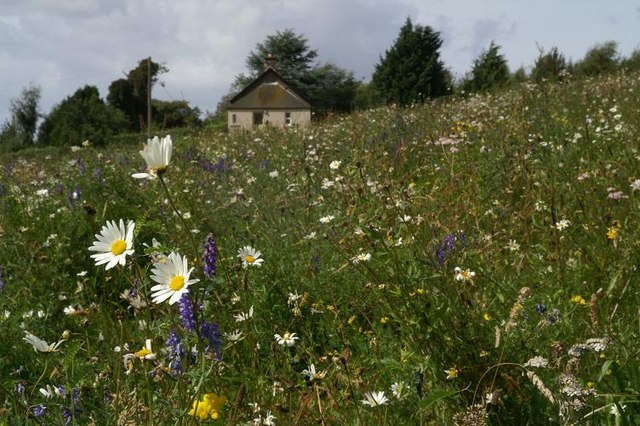
A Scottish meadow
