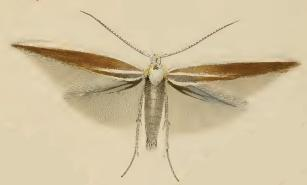

Scientific classification
- Kingdom: Animalia
- Phylum: Arthropoda
- Class: Insecta
- Order: Lepidoptera
- Family: Coleophoridae
- Genus: Coleophora
- Species: C. genistae

Binomial name
- Coleophora genistae Stainton, 1857

= Coleophora genistae =

Species of moth

Coleophora genistae is a moth of the family Coleophoridae. It is found from Sweden to the Iberian Peninsula, Sardinia, Italy and Greece and from Great Britain to Romania. It is also known from Turkey.

== Description ==
The wingspan is about 12 millimetres (0.47 in). They are on wing from June to August in western Europe.
