= Least willow =

Least willow is a common name for several plants and may refer to:

- Salix herbacea
- Salix rotundifolia
