= Adder's tongue =

Adder's tongue is a common name for several plants and may refer to:

- Ophioglossum, a genus of ferns in the family Ophioglossaceae
- Erythronium (also known as fawn lily, trout lily, or dog's-tooth violet), a genus of lilies

California fetid adderstongue and Bigelow's adderstongue are common names for Scoliopus bigelovii
