= Ifeoma Malo =

Nigerian lawyer

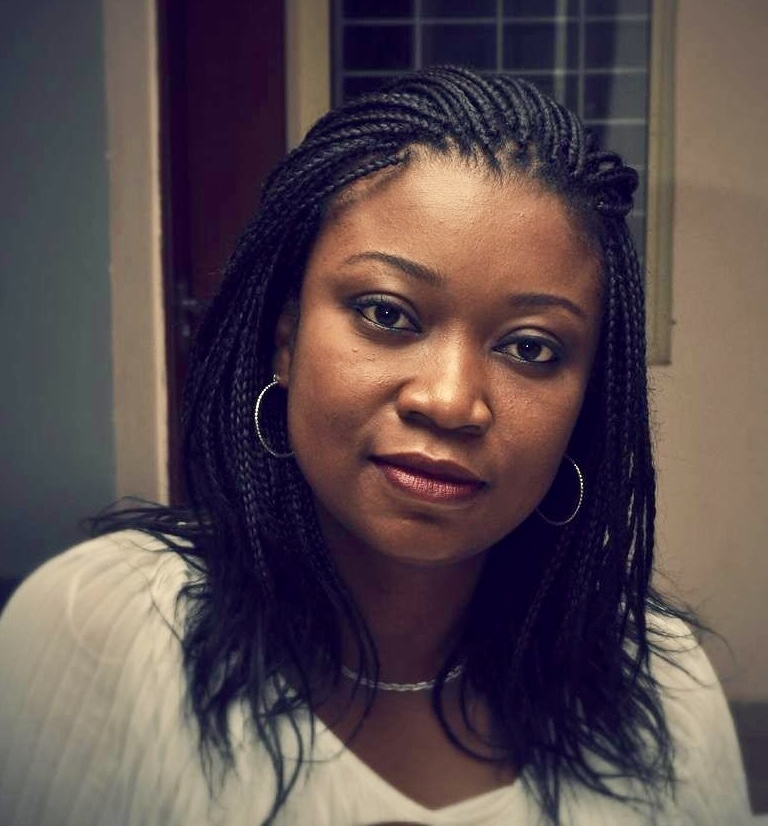
- Malo in 2016
- Education: University of Ibadan; Harvard University; University of Massachusetts Boston
- Occupation: Lawyer
- Known for: Energy development

Ifeoma Malo is a Nigerian lawyer working in international development. Her work focuses on clean energy technologies, and energy access and climate change mitigation and adaptation across Africa.

== Education ==
She obtained a bachelor's degree in law from the University of Ibadan in 2000 and holds multiple master's degrees: Law from Harvard University, Dispute Resolution, an MBA and a Masters in Information Technology, all from the University of Massachusetts Boston.

She also has a graduate certificate diploma in public policy from the University of Massachusetts Boston.

== Career ==
Malo began her career as counsel at Ashoka, office of West Africa and from there worked as a deputy head intellectual property at the firm of George Ikoli and Okagbue and later as a senior manager at the Negotiation and Conflict Management Group.

In the United States, Malo worked as an associate at the Boston Public Health Commission (BPHC) working under the policy department and contributing to initiatives that led to the states universal health coverage. She was an adjunct professor at the University of Massachusetts Boston in the College of Management. She also served as a consultant at the Global Biotechnology firm called Genzyme Corporation.

In 2015, she served as the chief of staff and senior technical adviser on energy policies, regulations and partnerships to Osita Nebo, the former Nigerian Minister of Power. She was the former Country Director of Power for All (2016–2020). She is currently the Co-Founder and Chief Executive Officer of Clean Tech Hub and Energy Innovation Center, Abuja. She also played a senior advisory role with the Chairman of the Nigerian Electricity Regulatory Commission.

She serves as an Independent Director of Norrenberger Financial Group, a Nigerian investment and financial services holding company. She also seats on the global board of Green Peace International in Netherlands and the board of Access to Energy Institute in Germany. She was a former board member of Budgit - Nigerian civic organisation that applies technology for citizen engagement with institutional improvement to facilitate societal change.

== Award and honors ==
In the year 2013, she was nominated among six Nigerians for Desmond Tutu Fellowship Programme. Malo won the Eisenhower Fellowship award in 2015. She is a Desmond Tutu fellow, African Leadership fellow, and Crans Montana New Leaders fellow. In addition, she is a fellow of the African Leadership Forum as well as a Global Leadership Academy fellow.

In 2020, Malo was selected by an international team of judges in the African Power and Energy Elite industry award as the Power Industry Leader of the year.
