= List of former places of worship in Wealden =

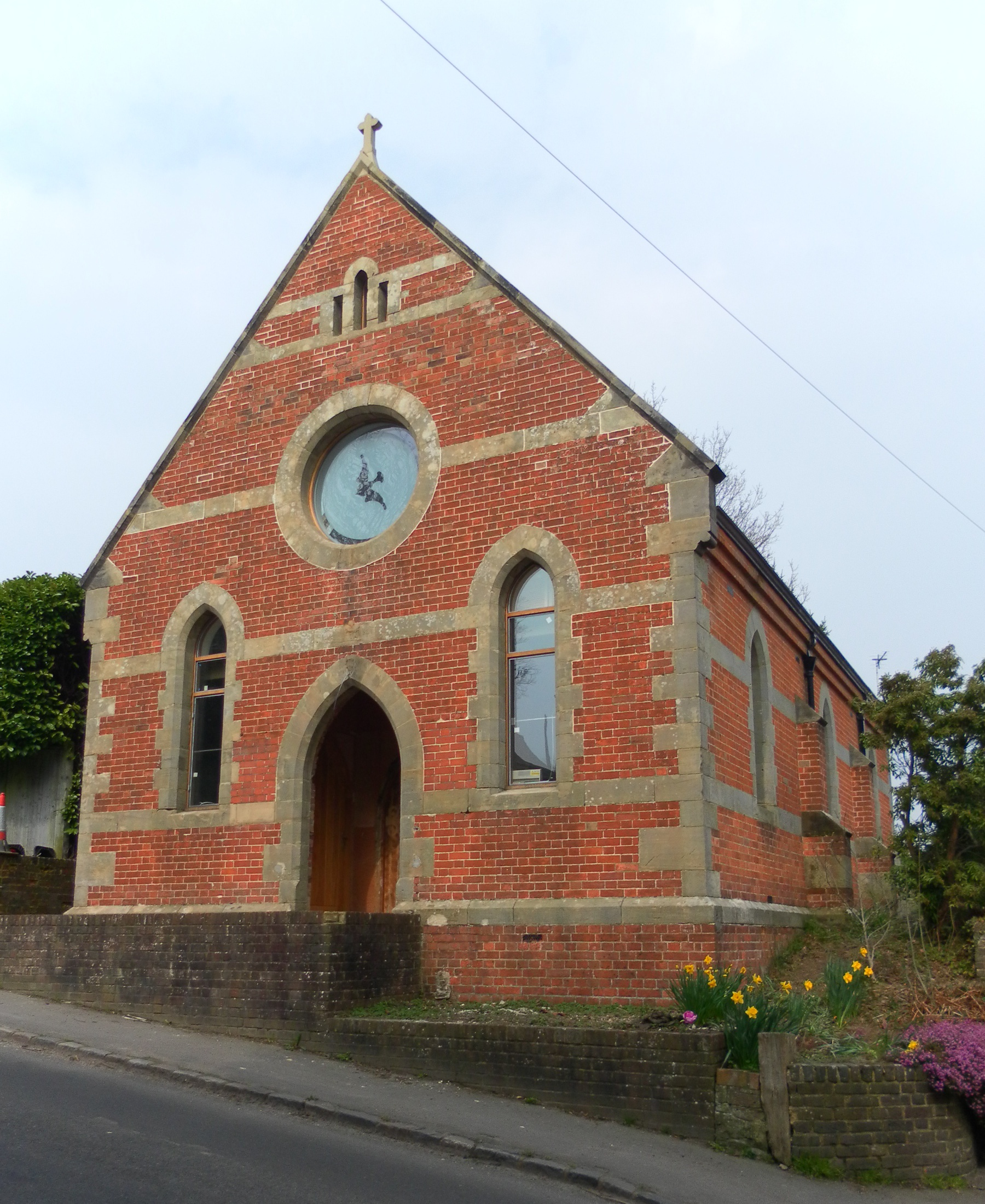
Rotherfield's Methodist chapel was built in 1879 and survived in religious use until the early 21st century.

In Wealden, the largest of six local government districts in the English county of East Sussex, there are 50 former churches, chapels and places of worship which are now used for other purposes or are disused. The mostly rural district, with five towns and multiple villages, has a 1,200-year documented history of Christian worship—a Saxon leader founded a church at Rotherfield in 790—and by the 19th century nearly every settlement had at least one church, as formerly extensive parishes were split up. Some have since fallen out of use because of changing patterns of population or declining attendance, or because they have been superseded by other churches. Protestant Nonconformism, always strong in Sussex, flourished in the area now covered by the district: many Baptist, Methodist and Congregational chapels were built, and although most survive, not all remain in religious use. The district also has more than 130 current places of worship.

Historic England or its predecessor English Heritage have awarded listed status to more than 60 current and former church buildings in Wealden. A building is defined as "listed" when it is placed on a statutory register of buildings of "special architectural or historic interest" in accordance with the Planning (Listed Buildings and Conservation Areas) Act 1990. The Department for Culture, Media and Sport, a Government department, is responsible for this; English Heritage, a non-departmental public body, acts as an agency of the department to administer the process and advise the department on relevant issues. There are three grades of listing status. Grade I, the highest, is defined as being of "exceptional interest"; Grade II* is used for "particularly important buildings of more than special interest"; and Grade II, the lowest, is used for buildings of "special interest". As of February 2001, there were 47 Grade I-listed buildings, 106 with Grade II* status and 2,020 Grade II-listed buildings in Wealden.

== Wealden and its places of worship ==
Wealden shown within East Sussex

Covering an area of 83,317 hectares (205,880 acres; 321.69 sq mi), Wealden is the largest of the six local authority areas in East Sussex, which has three small, highly urbanised coastal areas (the city of Brighton and Hove (Note: Brighton and Hove became a separate unitary authority in 1997, but is still part of the ceremonial county of East Sussex.) and the boroughs of Eastbourne and Hastings) and a large rural hinterland covered by three districts. Wealden is at the centre of these: the district of Lewes lies to the west and Rother is to the east.

Wealden's population at the time of the United Kingdom Census 2011 was 148,915. Five small towns—Crowborough, Hailsham, Heathfield, Polegate and Uckfield—account for about half of these people, and each has several places of worship catering for different denominations. The rest of the population is spread across dozens of villages and hamlets in the largely rural district. Many of these settlements have at least one church—often an ancient building on a site where worship has taken place for over a thousand years. St Wilfrid, exiled to Sussex in the late 7th century, and his near-contemporary St Cuthman rapidly Christianised the county, and the 111 churches described in the Domesday Book of 1086 was a significant underestimate.

== Former places of worship ==
Former places of worship
Name	Image	Location	Denomination/ Affiliation	Grade	Notes	Refs
Alfriston United Reformed Church (More images)		Alfriston; 50.8074°N 0.1572°E	United Reformed Church	II	On the village green by the River Cuckmere, this former Congregational chapel was built in 1801. The windows on the rendered façade are flat-arched and round-headed on the ground and first floors respectively. Independent and Countess of Huntingdon's Connexion congregations have also used the building, and it was named Independent Chapel when it was registered for marriages in August 1870. A partnership was formed with St Andrew's Church and it closed on 31 May 2009.	
Blackboys Methodist Church (More images)		Blackboys; 50.9670°N 0.1725°E	Methodist	–	The owner of nearby Possingworth Manor gave some of his land for this chapel, originally built for the Free Church community. The brick-built Vernacular-style building opened in 1883. After a period of disuse it was re-registered for worship in July 1987 and for marriages 11 years later; but planning permission to convert it into a house was granted in 2006 and its registration was cancelled in the same year.	
Highfields Presbyterian Church		Blackham; 51.1354°N 0.1260°E	Presbyterian Church of England	–	The church was founded and built in 1875, although the Kelly's Directory of 1895 described it as having been "erected by James Richard Haig of Highfields Park ... in memory of his wife Jane Haig, who died 26 March 1877". It was registered for marriages in January 1896. In 1950 it was sold at auction and converted into a house.	
Boars Head Chapel (More images)		Boarshead, Crowborough; 51.0714°N 0.1880°E	Methodist	–	A small chapel was built in the 19th century for the Wesleyan Methodist community at Boarshead. It was served from the Wesleyan church at Crowborough, which was the first of many Nonconformist places of worship in the town. Boars Head Chapel was deregistered for worship in 1967 after 106 years and is now the Chapel House Studio.	
Danehill Chapel (More images)		Chelwood Common; 51.0411°N 0.0134°E	Evangelical	–	A Particular Baptist congregation was recorded in this hamlet as early as 1778, but it was not until the 1880s that a mission hall was built. It was in use for about 120 years from then, latterly under the names Danehill Chapel and Danehill Christian Fellowship as an Evangelical chapel associated with a church at East Grinstead. Under that identity it was registered for worship in December 1965 and for marriages in July 1984. Planning permission was granted in 2015 for conversion into residential or commercial premises, at which time it was stated the building had been "entirely redundant as a place of worship for nine years", and it was subsequently offered for sale at £215,000.	
Colkins Mill Free Church (More images)		Coggins Mill, Mayfield; 51.0262°N 0.2748°E	Free Church	–	Coggins (or Colkins) Mill, a tiny hamlet east of Mayfield, acquired a place of worship in the 1870s when a resident donated land for a wooden chapel served by itinerant Nonconformist preachers. It was registered with the name Colkins Mill Gospel Hall in November 1935. In 1984, the congregation bought the former Methodist and Congregational chapel in Mayfield village centre, and the old chapel became a house—although its registration as a place of worship was not cancelled until 1992 when the other chapel was registered.	
Cousley Wood National School and Mission Church (More images)		Cousley Wood; 51.0764°N 0.3578°E	Anglican	–	Built in 1864 as a National School, this was in educational use until 1949 but also served as a church for many years. It was officially licensed in 1938 by the Bishop of Chichester, but congregations fell and the church became unviable. It closed in 1970 and was converted for residential use.	
Cousley Wood Free Church (More images)		Cousley Wood; 51.0759°N 0.3504°E	Non-denominational	–	Founded as the Monks Lane Mission in 1902, this chapel changed its name in 1973 and offered interdenominational services. The "tin tabernacle" had blue corrugated iron walls and some brickwork, but has been altered since its sale and conversion into a house.	
Cowbeech Preaching Station		Cowbeech; 50.9082°N 0.3020°E	Baptist	II	A mid-18th century cottage had a Baptist chapel built on to it in 1834, for an Independent Baptist community founded near Herstmonceux in 1800. It fell out of use in about 1950, and the building is now one house. The timber-framed, weatherboarded chapel has a large sash window and a hipped roof.	
Trinity Hall		Crowborough; 51.0594°N 0.1661°E	Baptist	–	A group of Baptists who met in a house on Eridge Road in the 1950s raised money to build a church nearby. Going by the names Park Road Church and Trinity Hall, it opened in the early 1960s and had a full-immersion baptism tank. The building was registered for worship and for marriages in December 1963 and September 1965 respectively. In 1994, permission was granted to convert the building into the headquarters of a Christian charity.	
Whitehill Citadel (More images)		Crowborough; 51.0465°N 0.1627°E	Salvation Army	–	Still in use in the 1980s, but now a well-used community centre and hall, Crowborough's Salvation Army place of worship was founded on 22 February 1908 by a Mrs Bassett. Its ministry covered a large area of East Sussex. Its registration for worship was officially cancelled in February 2000.	
Zion Chapel (More images)		Danehill; 51.0319°N 0.0008°W	Strict Baptist	–	A Strict Baptist community was founded here in 1810, and member William Roberts founded this chapel in 1815. Gospel Standard Baptists took over in 1894, but closure came in about 1967. The building had been recertified with the name Dane Hill Baptist Chapel in June 1961, but this registration was formally cancelled ten years later. The chapel, now a house, has a wooden porch on the red-brick façade.	
Providence Chapel		East Hoathly; 50.9253°N 0.1656°E	Methodist	–	In 1849, a Vernacular-style chapel was built down a narrow lane in East Hoathly. It served Independent Baptist worshippers for its first 20 years, but in 1869 a Strict Baptist minister called T. Funnell took over and renamed it Providence Chapel. The photograph is of a house which stands on the site, the original building was demolished together with two cottages. Funnell founded the new Hope Chapel at Blackboys in 1877.	
East Hoathly Methodist Chapel (More images)		East Hoathly; 50.9256°N 0.1654°E	Methodist	–	This chapel was in religious use until about 1941, although records exist of its marriage registration (granted in 1895) being cancelled in 1953. It was built in the centre of East Hoathly in 1900–01; the architects were Hall, Cooper and Davis of London and Scarborough, the general building work being carried out by the local firms of Halls and Trills. The red-brick and stone building has a small spire, and a wide, six-light, stone-mullioned window is prominent on the façade.	
Providence Strict Baptist Chapel (More images)		Forest Row; 51.0884°N 0.0300°E	Strict Baptist	–	Forest Row's Strict Baptist community founded a chapel in 1874. They moved to a larger red-brick building on the same road in 1928, registered it for marriages in 1930 and continued worshipping there until the early 21st century. Planning permission for residential conversion was granted in 2009.	
Our Lady of the Forest Church (More images)		Forest Row; 51.0949°N 0.0475°E	Roman Catholic	–	This church on the road to Hartfield was part of the parish of East Grinstead with Lingfield and Forest Row. The church, which was registered for worship in November 1958 and for marriages three months later, was visited in 1963 by John F. Kennedy while he was staying with Prime Minister (and local resident) Harold Macmillan. A shortage of priests forced it to close from 25 December 2009.	
Framfield Congregational Chapel (More images)		Framfield; 50.9643°N 0.1313°E	Congregational	–	The congregation, inspired and led by a pastor from Uckfield's Congregational church, met first in a cottage then in a larger house in the 1890s. A chapel was constructed on a site nearby in 1896; it opened on 3 December that year. Framfield, Uckfield and Isfield chapels joined as one Fellowship in 1900. A marriage licence was granted in 1933, Framfield broke away from Uckfield in 1955, and the cause failed in about 1993. The chapel is now a house.	
Congregational Mission Hall (More images)		Golden Cross; 50.8941°N 0.1755°W	Congregational	–	A Congregational chapel at Holmes's Hill, west of Golden Cross, marked on late 19th-century maps was superseded by another a short distance to the northeast. This was still marked as a Mission Church on a 1961 map, but is now a house.	
Providence Chapel (More images)		Hadlow Down; 50.9958°N 0.1816°E	Strict Baptist	II	The declining congregation were forced to abandon their 138-year-old chapel when the Great Storm of 1987 wrecked it. The Classical-influenced red- and blue-brick three-bay chapel has since been restored as a house. The first building on the site, founded by Henry Smith in 1824, was Hadlow Down's first place of worship. The second chapel was registered for marriages in January 1876.	
Gate House Baptist Chapel (More images)		Hadlow Down; 51.0013°N 0.1747°E	Baptist	–	Henry Donkin moved here in 1885 and founded this mission room ("the Tin Heaven") on his land soon afterwards. The tin tabernacle was moved nearer the village centre in 1907 and was registered for marriages in 1918. It became a full-time chapel in 1922, but closed after incumbent pastor's death in 1940. The corrugated iron building became a canteen then commercial premises.	
Halland Mission Hall (More images)		Halland (Note: Halland village was known as The Nursery until 1891, and it is under this name that plans for a mission church were lodged with the Incorporated Church Building Society in 1886–87.); 50.9300°N 0.1373°E	Anglican	–	Distance from the parish church at East Hoathly prompted the founding in 1886 of this mission room, which had a shingled spire and a belfry. The 114-capacity chapel also had a Sunday school, but this closed in 1941; the chapel itself held its last service in 1951, after which the building was modified and turned into a house.	
Hartfield Methodist Chapel (More images)		Hartfield; 51.0995°N 0.1078°E	Methodist	–	This former chapel on the High Street has been in residential use since 1968, the year after its registration for worship (granted in 1865) was cancelled. It was built in 1857 to replace a 50-year-old wooden building used by early Wesleyan worshippers in the village. The Classical-style brick and stone building has arched windows and a pediment with mouldings. Architect Peter Lambert Gibbs undertook the conversion from chapel to house.	
Kingdom Hall (More images)		Hawkswood, Hailsham; 50.8777°N 0.2587°E	Jehovah's Witnesses	–	Hailsham's first purpose-built Kingdom Hall was registered for worship in April 1970, superseding a room in a building on Market Street. It was also registered for marriages in July 1975. A new Kingdom Hall in Victoria Road replaced it in turn from March 1996. Demolition was threatened in 2004, but it now houses the East Sussex Federation of Women's Institutes.	
St Peter's Church		Holtye Common; 51.1337°N 0.0813°E	Anglican	–	William Moseley built a church at this rural location in 1836, but it was replaced in 1892 by prolific architect Lacy W. Ridge's small Perpendicular Gothic Revival building—just a nave and chancel with prominent flying buttresses and a belfry at the west end, all of stone. It was declared redundant as from 1 November 2007.	
Isfield Congregational Chapel (More images)		Isfield; 50.9430°N 0.0597°E	Congregational	–	The Isfield cause, linked with those in Framfield and Uckfield from 1900, started in about 1898 with help from Uckfield Congregational Church, which bought the chapel and adjoining houses in April 1943. Closure was approved on 31 March 1966, and the chapel was sold for residential conversion.	
Laughton Methodist Church (More images)		Laughton; 50.9073°N 0.1289°E	Methodist	–	This former chapel and the accompanying Sunday school and minister's house have been converted into a house. It was built around 1879 on the road from Laughton to Shortgate. It was formally registered for marriages between 1934 and 1981.	
Bethel Strict Baptist Chapel (More images)		Little London; 50.9558°N 0.2345°E	Strict Baptist	–	Now a dwelling called Chapel House, this tiny brick chapel on a lane in the parish of Waldron opened in 1879 and was closed exactly a century later. It was used by Independent Calvinists first, before becoming Strict Baptist.	
Wannock Baptist Chapel (More images)		Lower Willingdon; 50.8071°N 0.2444°E	Strict Baptist	–	Founded in a cottage in 1838 or 1839 by Hailsham preacher Thomas Wall, this cause gained a permanent chapel in 1851 and became aligned to the Gospel Standard movement in 1880. The stuccoed Vernacular-style building had a porch, sash windows and ornate iron railings. It closed in 1972 and became a house.	
Ebenezer Strict Baptist Chapel (More images)		Magham Down; 50.8804°N 0.2851°E	Strict Baptist	–	Also founded by Thomas Wall, this stuccoed wayside chapel dates from 1846. Its austere interior and tiny dimensions prompted Sussex church historian Robert Elleray to describe it as "possibly the smallest and simplest place of worship in Sussex". It closed in 1994 and was converted into a house.	
St John's Chapel (More images)		Maynard's Green; 50.9508°N 0.2493°E	Anglican	–	This rural hamlet near Heathfield was given a small chapel of ease in 1863. The Early English-style building had coursed stonework and red brickwork. It was converted into a house after its closure.	
New Gospel Hall (More images)		Maynard's Green; 50.9458°N 0.2500°E	Open Brethren	–	Also now in residential use, this chapel was built of red brick in 1905 and was registered for marriages in May 1908. The cause was founded by Open Brethren from Edgmond Hall (Note: Later Edgmond Evangelical Church; now Gateway Christian Church (see List of places of worship in Eastbourne for details).) in the Old Town area of Eastbourne, who travelled to villages throughout East Sussex in the 1880s to preach. A mission hall opened in 1887 and was succeeded by this building, which closed in February 1996 when Horam Chapel opened in nearby Horam.	
Nazarene Particular Baptist Chapel (More images)		Ninfield; 50.8867°N 0.4253°E	Strict Baptist	–	Built for Independent Calvinistic Baptists in 1831 and renovated in 1878, this chapel later became Strict Baptist and was sometimes served by pastors from the Rehoboth Chapel at Pell Green. It was reregistered in 1961 for "Calvinistic Protestant Dissenters", but religious use ceased in about 1971 and the chapel was deregistered in 1994. The cause originated in a house in nearby Russell's Green.	
St Laurence's Chapel		Otteham Court, Polegate; 50.8292°N 0.2528°E	Pre-Reformation (Note: The church fell out of use before the Reformation, when the Church of England was established.)	II*	The remnants of this abbey chapel—sedilia, a piscina and two windows—are 14th-century, but worship has taken place at the site since 1175 or before. It was described as a parish church in the 15th and 16th centuries, until the Reformation. Otham Abbey was owned by Premonstratensian Canons who later moved to Bayham Abbey, and the stone-built chapel is now on private land.	
Rehoboth Chapel (More images)		Pell Green, Wadhurst; 51.0738°N 0.3472°E	Strict Baptist	II	Strict Baptists met at Pell Green from 1818, and had their own place of worship from 1824 when Thomas Kemp built a chapel next to an old cottage. It was extended several times in its early history—for example, the three-bay façade was widened by the addition of one bay and a lean-to. The timber-framed, weatherboarded chapel was converted into a house in the 1980s. Its registration for marriages, granted in April 1864, was formally cancelled in March 1980.	
Holy Rood Church (More images)		Pevensey Bay; 50.8103°N 0.3446°E	Roman Catholic	–	Services began at this small church on 30 June 1963, and it was consecrated three years later and registered for marriages in August 1967. Storm damage in 1990 cost £12,000 to repair. It was latterly part of a joint parish with the Church of Christ the King in neighbouring Langney, a suburb of Eastbourne. The church closed for worship after the final Mass on 24 October 2016, celebrated by Roman Catholic Bishop of Arundel and Brighton Richard Moth.	
Mount House Chapel		Piltdown; 50.9801°N 0.0583°E	Church of Christ then Baptist	–	A red- and blue-brick building in the Vernacular style served as a chapel for the Piltdown area near Uckfield from about 1860 until the late 20th century. It became a house in 1980.	
Rotherfield Methodist Church (More images)		Rotherfield; 51.0504°N 0.2295°E	Methodist	–	Methodists met in a house from 1794, and other private buildings (including oast houses) were used until this red-brick chapel and attached classroom opened in 1879. It held 175 worshippers, but closed early in the 21st century.	
St Peter, Prince of Apostles Church (More images)		Rotherfield; 51.0419°N 0.2165°E	Roman Catholic	–	Rotherfield's Roman Catholic church was part of a joint parish with the Church of the Sacred Heart at nearby Wadhurst. The 120-capacity building was completed in December 1963 and was registered for worship and for marriages in April 1964. It closed for worship in 2019.	
Little St Mary's Church		Rushlake Green; 50.9405°N 0.3130°E	Anglican	–	Now a village hall and community centre, this short-lived place of worship served a small village in the parish of Warbleton, from whose parish church it may derive its name. The firm of J.D. Clarke and Sons submitted plans to the Incorporated Church Building Society to rebuild it in 1963–66.	
Russell's Green Wesleyan Methodist Chapel (More images)		Russell's Green; 50.8761°N 0.4167°E	Methodist	–	Wesleyan Methodists founded a hipped-roofed red-brick chapel at this hamlet south of Ninfield in 1832. It was extended later in that century to give an extra bay, and was registered for marriages in July 1921. The building is now residential, and the date-stone on the façade has been damaged.	
Shover's Green Baptist Chapel		Shover's Green, Wadhurst; 51.0500°N 0.3566°E	Strict Baptist	II	Strict Baptists from Burwash expanded their mission in 1816 by founding a new chapel at this hamlet near Ticehurst. The three-bay, weatherboarded, arch-windowed building was completed in 1817. A lean-to vestry was added later, and the walls are now of brick. Closure came in about 1973, and the building became a house, retaining most of its features. Its registration for marriages, granted in March 1844, was formally cancelled in March 1980.	
Salvation Army Hall (More images)		Sparrow's Green, Wadhurst; 51.0661°N 0.3336°E	Salvation Army	–	The Wadhurst Corps of the Salvation Army was established in 1892, and it built a hall in the Sparrow's Green area of the village the following year (after initially meeting at founding member Samuel Fairbrother's house). The hall passed into commercial use after the dissolution of the Corps in 1975, and another hall (pictured) was used for a time. The building's registration for marriages, granted in January 1962, was formally cancelled in March 1980.	
Turner's Green Gospel Hall (More images)		Turner's Green, Wadhurst; 51.0718°N 0.3360°E	Open Brethren	–	The present building is the second on the site. The first corrugated iron chapel, dating from 1941 and registered for worship and for marriages in May 1956, was destroyed by fire in 1970. A cedar wood and tile replacement meeting house, costing £2,500, was opened soon afterwards, but the cause failed in the early 1980s and the building was sold in 1987.	
Mount Hermon Baptist Chapel (More images)		Turner's Green, Warbleton; 50.9518°N 0.3247°E	Strict Baptist	–	Thomas Dallaway seceded from Heathfield Chapel in 1865 and founded this new chapel, which became aligned to the Strict Baptist cause (and later the Gospel Standard movement). It was a Vernacular-style red-brick building with a porch. It was sold in the early 21st century and became a private wedding chapel; the congregation joined The Rest Chapel at nearby Three Cups Corner. Its marriage registration was cancelled in July 2007.	
Uckfield Baptist Church (More images)		Uckfield; 50.9770°N 0.1000°E	Baptist	II	Seceders from Five Ash Down established a chapel in the north of Uckfield in 1788. The present building, now a house, dates from 1874 and was built of brick with arched windows. The entrance has distinctive bargeboards. In the 1920s, the congregation split and Strict Baptists moved to Foresters Chapel. Uckfield Baptist Church is still an active congregation, but it meets at a school: the former chapel's registration was cancelled in June 2005.	
Uckfield Methodist Church (More images)		Uckfield; 50.9669°N 0.0997°E	Methodist	–	This church was founded by the Wesleyan Methodist community in 1897 to replace one in the Ridgewood area of Uckfield. The present brick structure replaced a wooden chapel. In the 1950s the congregation considered merging with the town's United Reformed Church, but this did not happen and the chapel was rebuilt and extended at that time instead. It was also registered for marriages in March 1962. The plans of the 1950s were revived in the 21st century, and in May 2017 the church formally united with Uckfield United Reformed Church, taking the name Cornerstone Church and using the latter's premises. The marriage registration was cancelled in May 2019.	
Upper Dicker Methodist Chapel		Upper Dicker; 50.8685°N 0.2075°E	Methodist	–	This Wesleyan chapel had a short life: it was defunct shortly after appearing on a map of 1843, and later became a school, reading room, community hall, youth club and (in 1970) the headquarters of a cheese manufacturing and distribution company.	
New Gospel Hall (More images)		Vines Cross; 50.9369°N 0.2681°E	Plymouth Brethren	–	Opened in 1911, this chapel's initially large congregation ebbed away over the years; it was closed in the 1970s and sold for conversion into "an attractive and unusual" house. It stands on Ballsocks Lane.	
Wadhurst Town Chapel (More images)		Wadhurst; 51.0620°N 0.3402°E	Baptist	–	Only a circular window in the back wall gives any indication that this building (now a greengrocer's shop) was originally in religious use. It was built as a Wesleyan Methodist chapel and was acquired by Strict Baptists who had worshipped in a now demolished chapel of 1815. It was run from Shover's Green and fell out of use in 1935.	
Wadhurst Methodist Church (More images)		Wadhurst; 51.0614°N 0.3415°E	Methodist	–	Built in 1874 in the Renaissance Revival style, this chapel on the High Street has red and yellow brickwork with contrasting quoins and a three-bay arched and gabled façade. It succeeded a chapel of 1814 which housed a congregation founded in 1792. The church's registration for was cancelled in March 2016 and the building was offered for sale with the intention of converting it into residential accommodation.	

== See also ==
- Media related to Places of worship in Wealden at Wikimedia Commons
- List of current places of worship in Wealden
- List of demolished places of worship in East Sussex

== Bibliography ==
- Antram, Nicholas; Pevsner, Nikolaus (2013). Sussex: East with Brighton and Hove. The Buildings of England. London: Yale University Press. ISBN 978-0-300-18473-0.
- Chambers, Ralph F. (1954). The Strict Baptist Chapels of England – Volume II: Sussex. Thornton Heath: Ralph F. Chambers.
- Elleray, D. Robert (2004). Sussex Places of Worship. Worthing: Optimus Books. ISBN 0-9533132-7-1.
- Fisher, E.A. (1970). The Saxon Churches of Sussex. Newton Abbot: David & Charles. ISBN 0-7153-4946-5.
- Foord, Keith (2017b). Methodism in Eastern Sussex 1756–2017 (PDF). Battle and District Historical Society Collectanea: Topic F (Religion, General, Conformist, Non-Conformist and Roman Catholic), Item 3.2. Battle: Battle and District Historical Society. Archived (PDF) from the original on 21 November 2020.
- Gillet, Alan; Russell, Barry K. (1991). Around Heathfield in Old Photographs: a Second Selection. Stroud: Alan Sutton Publishing Ltd. ISBN 0-86299-950-2.
- Gould, Wyndham (Autumn 2004). Harker, Michael (ed.). "Halland Mission Hall". Hindsight. 10. Uckfield: Uckfield and District Preservation Society. ISSN 1464-6293.
- Hadlow Down Book Committee (1999). Hadlow Down: an Autobiography (Incorporating Alice Catharine Day's Glimpses of Rural Life in Sussex). Hadlow Down: Hadlow Down Millennium Book Committee. ISBN 0-9537125-0-8.
- Homan, Roger (1997). "Mission and Fission: the organization of Huntingtonian and Calvinistic Baptist causes in Sussex in the 18th and 19th centuries". Sussex Archaeological Collections. 135. Lewes: Sussex Archaeological Society. doi:10.5284/1085045. ISSN 0143-8204.
- Howard, Eve, ed. (1992). Mayfield: a Short Historic Guide (Illustrated) (3rd ed.). Mayfield: Mayfield Local History Society.
- Longstaff-Tyrrell, Peter (2004). A Portrait of Polegate (1st ed.). Polegate: GoteHouse Publishing. ISBN 0-9521297-9-5.
- Payne, Malcolm (1985). Crowborough: the Growth of a Wealden Town. Studley: K.A.F. Brewin Books. ISBN 0-947731-04-0.
- Savidge, Alan; Mason, Oliver (1988). Wadhurst: Town of the High Weald. Rainham: Meresborough Books. ISBN 0-948193-35-2.
- Stell, Christopher (2002). Nonconformist Chapels and Meeting-houses in Eastern England. Swindon: English Heritage. ISBN 1-873592-50-7.
- Thorogood, Derek (1994). Uckfield Congregational Church: An Account of the Years 1866–1972. Framfield: Derek Thorogood. ISBN 0-9524531-0-X.
- Our Village: a Pictorial Record of a Sussex Village. Rotherfield: Rotherfield History Research Group. 1979.
- Walkley, Victor G. (1972). A Church Set on a Hill: the Story of Edgmond Hall, Eastbourne, 1872–1972. Eastbourne: Upperton Press.
- Whatmore, Leonard E. (1978). Story of Our Lady of Ransom, Eastbourne.
- Wilkins, Amanda (2000). Pevensey & Wallsend: a History of Pevensey and Pevensey Bay. Lewes: The Book Guild Ltd. ISBN 1-85776-560-5.
- s.n. (1933). The Story of Crowborough. Tunbridge Wells: Courier Co. Ltd.
