= List of demolished places of worship in East Sussex =

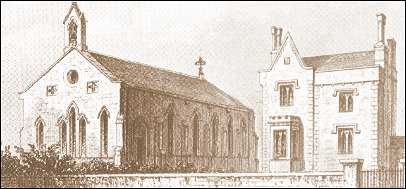
St Clement's Church served the Halton area of Hastings from 1839 until its demolition in 1970.

In the English county of East Sussex, many former chapels, churches and other places of worship have been demolished without direct replacement. Declining congregations, structural problems, commercial redevelopment, wartime bombing and many other reasons have contributed to the loss of more than 70 buildings across the county. Several have been demolished in the seaside resorts of Eastbourne and Hastings and the hilltop town of Crowborough; elsewhere, tiny villages such as Magham Down and Iden have lost former chapels; and other churches have disappeared from isolated rural sites such as Ashdown Park and Twyford House, both in the heart of the dense Ashdown Forest which covers the northwest of the county.

Details of all places of public worship which have been completely demolished without direct replacement on the same site are recorded here. Private, hospital, school, prison and similar chapels are excluded, as are former churches which are ruinous but still extant—such as the former parish churches of Bulverhythe (St Mary's) and Ore (St Helen's), both in Hastings. Buildings demolished to allow a new church to be constructed on the same site are also excluded; but if a church was pulled down and a replacement was built on a different site, as at Pevensey Bay (St Wilfrid's Church) and Seaford (the Baptist church), details of the old building are given.

Many churches listed here were built during the 19th century and demolished after World War II. Although the government's scheme of statutory listing for buildings of special architectural and historic interest had started in the 1940s, it was—with a few exceptions—not until the late 20th century that churches and chapels of the Victorian era began to be given the protection from demolition or significant alteration which listed status confers. By 1980, nearly 80 of the approximately 600 Victorian places of worship across Sussex as a whole had been lost. Many demolition-threatened buildings survived by "pure chance, combined with the laudable initiative of a few private individuals": processes to preserve former churches that were no longer required, coordinated at a denominational or local level, never developed. Fewer places of worship have been lost since about 1980, as charitable bodies such as the Churches Conservation Trust, Friends of Friendless Churches and Historic Chapels Trust have become more influential and local initiatives have had more success: for example, in 2009 Bexhill-on-Sea residents successfully campaigned against the demolition of two churches within a month. Nevertheless, "a number of important demolitions" have affected the architecture and townscape of Hastings (among them Mount Pleasant Church, the Central Methodist Church, St Andrew's and St Paul's—"a building of fine quality erected ... at great cost"), Eastbourne (Pevensey Road Congregational Church, St Peter's Church and others) and other places.

== Demolished places of worship ==
Demolished places of worship
Name	Location	District	Denomination	Completed	Demolished	Present use of site	Notes	Refs
St Richard de Wych's Church	Ashdown Park, Wych Cross; 51.0694°N 0.0490°E	Wealden	Anglican	1886	1974	Vacant	Ashdown Park House, a mansion in Ashdown Forest, was rebuilt in 1867 by Thomas Thompson, who founded a farm and built houses for its workers. Concerned at the lack of a local place of worship, he founded this church in the grounds of the house. Attendances declined after Holy Trinity Church was built at nearby Coleman's Hatch and the house became a Roman Catholic convent with its own chapel. After closing in 1940 and deteriorating to a ruined state, it was demolished in 1974 and the site was cleared. An unknown architect designed it in a French Gothic Revival style, and it was "a building of considerable interest and distinction [... and] one of the finest Victorian churches in Sussex".	
St Peter's Church	Baldslow; 50.8885°N 0.5608°E	Hastings	Anglican	1863	c. 1986	Agricultural buildings	This tin tabernacle—perhaps more elaborate than typical iron churches, because an architect's name (one of the Habershon brothers) is given—was erected in this outlying area of Hastings in 1863. It had a bellcote at the west end. It closed in 1979, and demolition was said to be pending in 1981.	
Vidler's Chapel	Battle; 50.9185°N 0.4843°E	Rother	Unitarian	1789	1958	Car park	Battle's first Baptist chapel was founded by William Vidler in 1789 on Mount Street. Its character changed from Strict to General Baptist and then Unitarian in quick succession: the influence of American Universalist Elhanan Winchester shaped Vidler's religious views. The congregation split, the seceders founded Zion Chapel on an adjacent site, and Vidler's Chapel closed in 1897 or 1898 and passed out of religious use. It stood until 1958; its demolition was hastened by structural problems in 1940s. The brick building's hipped roof was hidden behind a parapet. Below this was a three-bay façade with arched windows and doorway. It has been described as a "good design [and a] bad loss".	
First Church of Christ, Scientist	Bexhill-on-Sea; 50.8401°N 0.4809°E	Rother	Christian Science	1931	2001	Residential (St George's Court)	A mayor of Bexhill-on-Sea introduced Christian Science worship to the town in 1905. Services were held in his house, then the Station Road Institute building. In 1914 the congregation bought a site for a permanent church, and a Sunday school building was put up in 1920 alongside a wartime Army hut which was used as a church temporarily. The permanent building, described as Edwardian Baroque in style, was built in 1930–31. Services were held from March 1931 until 1995, and it was formally deregistered as a place of worship in July 2000. The empty building was demolished for flats in 2001.	
Haddocks Hill Primitive Methodist Chapel	Bexhill-on-Sea; 50.8539°N 0.4762°E	Rother	Methodist	1873	1920	Residential	Primitive Methodists from Hastings founded a tiny chapel on the road to Sidley in 1873. The much larger Christ Church on nearby Springfield Road, completed in 1907, superseded it. The original chapel also founded a small daughter church in the newly developed Reginald Road area of the town: the congregation met in a shop.	
St Paul's Church	Bohemia, St Leonards-on-Sea; 50.8563°N 0.5630°E	Hastings	Anglican	1868	1964	Residential (Norfolk House)	The demolition in 1964 of this small but expensively built church was described by one historian as "the most grievous loss among the Victorian churches of Hastings". John Newton, who worked under Sir George Gilbert Scott before entering private practice, was its architect. There was a nave, chancel with apsidal end and a tower with decorative shafts. The interior was opulent, as were fixtures such as the pulpit and font. The west window, depicting the Communion of saints, was designed in 1888 by Nathaniel Westlake. It was preserved and reused at St John's Church in Belmont, south London, in architect David Evelyn Nye's 1967 extension to that church.	
Burwash Congregational Church	Burwash; 50.9974°N 0.3861°E	Rother	Congregational	1864	1970	Residential (Old Rectory Court)	Originally built for Independents, this chapel's worshippers embraced Congregationalism from 1901 when it came under the influence of Robertson Street Congregational Church in Hastings. Services continued until 1967. It was an Italianate building of brick and stucco. It replaced an even older Independent chapel, from which seceders had founded both Shover's Green Baptist Chapel and Burwash's own Strict Baptist chapel (both now closed).	
Burwash Weald Methodist Church	Burwash Weald; 50.9847°N 0.3521°E	Rother	Methodist	1843	c. 1996	Residential	This Vernacular-style chapel had red-brick walls, a gabled roof and lancet windows on the façade. It served a congregation which had developed in 1831. Worship ceased in the 1970s; the building was apparently still standing in 1996, but was subsequently demolished.	
Cliffe Chapel	Cliffe, Lewes; 50.8742°N 0.0202°E	Lewes	Countess of Huntingdon's Connexion	1775	c. 1879	Residential	Early in its existence, this chapel in East Street (now Chapel Hill) was ministered by Jenkin Jenkins, whose uncompromising Calvinist beliefs caused a split in the congregation. Some left and joined him at a new chapel nearby—the Jireh Chapel, built for Jenkins by William Huntington S.S.—in 1805. Cliffe Chapel continued in use for most of the 19th century but was eventually demolished.	
Cowbeech District Church	Cowbeech; 50.9113°N 0.3043°E	Wealden	Anglican	c. 1911	c. 1971	Vacant	A building was known to have existed in this outlying hamlet in Herstmonceux parish in 1911. It closed in 1971.	
Sweethaws Chapel	Crowborough; 51.0372°N 0.1403°E	Wealden	Anglican	1896	1969	Garden	Originally a private chapel for the Spedding family of Sweethaws, this timber-built chapel was presented to the vicar of All Saints parish church in Crowborough in 1920 and became a public place of worship. The roof had a bellcote.	
Branch Strict Baptist Chapel	Crowborough; 51.0587°N 0.1631°E	Wealden	Strict Baptist	1896	2010	Residential	This was built in 1896 by the Congregational community, but in 1906 it was taken on by members of the Forest Fold Baptist Chapel. It closed in 1988 or 1989 and converted into a shop, but its red-brick Dutch gable survived. Its registration for worship was officially cancelled in February 2000. Planning permission for its demolition and replacement with a mixed-use building was granted in 2010, and demolition took place the same year.	
Crowborough Methodist Church	Crowborough; 51.0543°N 0.1610°E	Wealden	Methodist	1897	c. 1990	Residential (Clifford Court, Wesley Mews)	Frederick Boreham designed this church in 1897 for Crowborough's Methodist community, which developed from 1875. The building was of stone and had lancet windows. It went out of religious use in the early 20th century, although its registration for worship—granted in July 1904—was not formally cancelled until August 1972. It first became the church hall of All Saints Church, then the Crowborough Ex-Servicemen's Club, then a mixed-use hall and community building housing a playgroup and other facilities. Worshippers joined the former Joseph Parker Congregational Church, also on Croft Road, which became the Union Church.	
St George's Church	Downside, Eastbourne; 50.7738°N 0.2595°E	Eastbourne	Anglican	1916	1976	Residential	This church was founded in the Downside area of the town by St Mary's Church, the ancient parish church, and was always a chapel of ease to it. It was designed in the Decorated Gothic Revival style in 1916 by an unknown architect. It had red-brick walls with some stonework and a corner tower with a tiled spire, and the nave was lit by three-light lancet windows. The Diocese of Chichester declared it redundant on 28 May 1974 and the site was sold for housing development in accordance with an Order in Council granted in October 1975.	
Victoria Drive Baptist Church	Downside, Eastbourne; 50.7746°N 0.2572°E	Eastbourne	Baptist	1926	1973	Residential	The present Victoria Baptist Church on Eldon Road replaced this chapel of 1926 on the corner of Victoria Drive and Broomfield Street. Stephen Box designed the red-brick and stone Gothic Revival building, which had lancet windows throughout.	
Emmanuel Church	Eastbourne; 50.7673°N 0.2807°E	Eastbourne	Anglican; Free Church of England	c. 1880	c. 1960	Charitable organisation (WRVS Russell Centre)	This modest prefabricated building, topped with a bellcote, was put up in about 1880 in a central location in Eastbourne, and was used for Anglican worship until about 1918. Later re-registered for worship by the Free Church of England (Reformed Episcopal Church) in April 1927 and solemnised for marriages in August 1930, its final closure came during World War II: the building was damaged by bombs and demolition came soon afterwards (its registration was cancelled in August 1963).	
St Paul's Church	Eastbourne; 50.7648°N 0.2870°E	Eastbourne	Anglican	1873	1909	Residential (Garden Court)	This short-lived tin tabernacle on Burlington Place served as a chapel of ease to Holy Trinity Church. It was topped with a bellcote.	
St Peter's Church (first building)	Eastbourne; 50.7669°N 0.2775°E	Eastbourne	Anglican	1878	1905	Car park	Henry Currey designed a temporary church dedicated to St Peter on a site behind Eastbourne Town Hall in 1878. It was founded by George Whelpton and was a chapel of ease to the nearby St Saviour's Church, which had opened a decade earlier. The brick and tile building was sold to the Congregational Church in 1894 when the permanent St Peter's Church was ready; this group occupied it until about 1905.	
St Peter's Church (second building)	Eastbourne; 50.7645°N 0.2752°E	Eastbourne	Anglican	1896	1971	Residential (Redman King House)	Henry Currey was again commissioned for the permanent St Peter's Church on Meads Road, near its temporary predecessor. His Early English Gothic Revival design made use of stone (for the exterior) and brick (inside, where there was also a hanging Rood). Construction started in 1894 and continued for two years. The Diocese of Chichester declared the church redundant on 29 August 1971, and it was demolished for flats despite being awarded listed status.	
Pevensey Road Congregational Church	Eastbourne; 50.7698°N 0.2908°E	Eastbourne	Congregational	1862	1977	Residential (Grafton Court)	This large town-centre church was designed by the firm of Searle, Son and Yelf in 1862. Their Early English Gothic Revival-style stone building had a tower at the southeast corner. It was described soon after its demolition as a "pleasant corner-site building with a fine organ", which was also lost. It had been registered for marriages in October 1864.	
St Aidan's Church	Eastbourne; 50.7772°N 0.2977°E	Eastbourne	Methodist	1913	2001	Residential (St Aidan's Court)	Architects Baines and Son designed this Methodist church for residents on the eastern side of Eastbourne. The style was Perpendicular Gothic Revival, and the building was mostly of red brick with some stonework.	
Wesley Hall	Eastbourne; 50.7783°N 0.2982°E	Eastbourne	Methodist	1904		Residential	Another Methodist chapel on the east side of Eastbourne, this was in religious use between 1904 and 1950. It was then in commercial use until its demolition. Like St Aidan's Church, it was built of red brick. Its marriage licence was cancelled in December 1936.	
Stella Maris Church	Eastbourne; 50.7689°N 0.2842°E	Eastbourne	Roman Catholic	1869	1893	Commercial (Arndale Centre)	A Roman Catholic mission was started in Eastbourne by Fr Charles P. King in 1867. He opened a small chapel dedicated to Stella Maris (Mary, Star of the Sea) two years later on the corner of Terminus Road and Junction Road, near the railway station. It closed and was demolished before the new Church of Our Lady of Ransom was opened (in 1899).	
Church of the Good Shepherd (Images)	Five Ashes; 51.0038°N 0.2204°E	Wealden	Anglican	1920	2017	Hospice	Considered a "remarkable survival" when still in active use, this wooden board-walled building was moved to the large village of Five Ashes, near Mayfield, in about 1920 after serving as a World War I Army building at Eastbourne. A belfry and porch were added after the building opened as a church. It closed in 2017 and was dismantled to make way for the Hospice in the Weald, a large new hospice building which has an integrated interdenominational chapel dedicated to The Good Shepherd. The church was acquired by Etchingham Military and Aviation Preservation Group, who have re-erected it as a World War I museum on a new site between Etchingham and Hurst Green.	
Congregational Church	Friday Street; 50.8094°N 0.2994°E	Eastbourne	Congregational	1869	c. 1970	Residential	This red-brick chapel on the outskirts of Eastbourne was a daughter church of the Pevensey Road Congregational Chapel in central Eastbourne.	
St Clement's Church	Halton, Hastings; 50.8654°N 0.5946°E	Hastings	Anglican	1839	1970	Residential	Work on this suburban church, funded by local benefactor Countess Waldegrave, started in 1838. Doubt exists over the names of both the original architects and those who added the chancel in 1888. The Gothic Revival building had lancet windows, an aisleless nave and a bellcote. Sir Ninian Comper provided a stained glass window in 1939.	
Mount Pleasant Congregational Church	Halton, Hastings; 50.8659°N 0.5844°E	Hastings	Congregational	1878	1972	Residential (Hughenden Court)	Demolished for a residential building in 1972, this large church has been called architect Thomas Elworthy's chef d'œuvre. He built it in 1878–79 in the Early English Gothic Revival style with a corner tower topped with a spire. The building was of red brick dressed with terracotta. It was latterly known as St Mark's United Reformed Church, and the smaller replacement chapel on a nearby site took this name. Its marriage registration (granted in January 1881) was not formally cancelled until 1975.	
St Luke's Church	Hampden Park; 50.7963°N 0.2779°E	Eastbourne	United Reformed	1913	2007	Vacant	The congregation of this former Presbyterian chapel joined St Stephen's Methodist Church, also in Hampden Park, after their 1913 red-brick and stone Perpendicular Gothic Revival building was demolished. George Baines was the architect. St Stephen's became a joint Methodist/United Reformed Church place of worship called Broadway United Church. St Luke's was deregistered as a place of worship in December 2005.	
Blacknest Methodist Chapel	Hankham; 50.8199°N 0.2903°E	Wealden	Methodist	1891	c. 1983	Residential	This red-brick chapel, part of the Eastbourne Methodist Circuit and administered by Central Methodist Church, Eastbourne, held its final service on 20 April 1983. It was also known as Blackness Chapel, and was registered for marriages between May 1895 and November 1983.	
St Andrew's Church	Hastings; 50.8595°N 0.5833°E	Hastings	Anglican	1869	1970	Commercial (Morrisons petrol station)	M.E. Habershon and E.P.L. Brock's large town-centre church was home to an artwork by Hastings-based author Robert Tressell. The building had a slim tower with a pyramidal spire, a single-aisle nave and an apse to the chancel end.	
Central Methodist Church	Hastings; 50.8559°N 0.5753°E	Hastings	Methodist	1875	1980	Residential (Holmebury House)	W. W. Pocock's large and "visually important" Wesleyan Methodist church stood on an imposing hilly corner site in the town centre. It was a stone and ashlar Early English Gothic Revival building with a tower at the southwest corner, and cost £8,000. It was deregistered as a place of worship in June 1974 and fell into dilapidation after its closure that year.	
St Catherine's Church (Images)	Heathfield; 50.9734°N 0.2580°E	Wealden	Roman Catholic	1953	2016	Residential	Until 2014, this was the parish church covering Heathfield and the Rother district villages of Burwash and Hurst Green. It dated from 1953 and was a gabled red-brick building with a timber-framed tiled roof. In 2014 the Church of Christ the King at Burwash became the parish church and St Catherine's was declared redundant. Its marriage registration (granted in January 1956) was cancelled in August 2015 and plans for its demolition and replacement with flats were submitted to Wealden District Council in November 2015. St Catherine's was also associated with an order of Benedictine sisters at Cross In Hand, whose chapel (dedicated to the Holy Cross) is now employed as a chapel of ease within the parish. (Note: See List of current places of worship in Wealden for a description and image.)	
St James's Church	Herstmonceux; 50.8890°N 0.3243°E	Wealden	Anglican	1893		Vacant	This was opened in the centre of Herstmonceux village in 1893 to provide easier access to a place of Anglican worship: All Saints Church, the parish church, was 2 miles (3.2 km) away.	
Hurst Green Wesleyan Methodist Church	Hurst Green; 51.0143°N 0.4720°E	Rother	Methodist	c. 1821	c. 1961	Commercial	A Methodist society was recorded here in the early 19th century, and it was placed in the Rye Methodist Circuit. A chapel was built later; it was licensed for marriages until 1959 and was in use until the following year.	
Icklesham Wesleyan Chapel	Icklesham; 50.9163°N 0.6689°E	Rother	Methodist	1843	c. 1980	Residential	Built of brick in 1843, this small building fronted the main road through Icklesham and had a gabled entrance on to it flanked by two windows with pointed arches. An extension was added in the 20th century.	
Iden Wesleyan Chapel	Iden; 50.9828°N 0.7352°E	Rother	Methodist	1848	1944	Vacant	Iden's first Wesleyan chapel was built in 1819. Its red-brick replacement of 1848 (registered for marriages in 1912) was destroyed by a World War II bomb in 1944. A third chapel was built in the centre of the village.	
Congregational Chapel	Jarvis Brook; 51.0430°N 0.1878°E	Wealden	Congregational	1864		Vacant	Thomas William Masterman founded a church in a barn in Jarvis Brook in 1862. Two years later, he was able to build a proper chapel with an attached Sunday school.	
Ebenezer Gospel Hall	Jarvis Brook; 51.0474°N 0.1875°E	Wealden	Open Brethren	a.-1898	1999	Residential	This Gospel hall on Victoria Road was used by the town's Open Brethren community. Under the name Ebenezer Evangelical Church, its marriage registration was cancelled in March 1998.	
Bethesda Calvinist Chapel	Lewes; 50.8752°N 0.0105°E	Lewes	Baptist	1813	1973	Residential	This Calvinistic Baptist congregation was officially constituted as a church in 1827, but their chapel on St John Street was older: it was recorded as a "school house" from 1813. The rebuilding was altered in 1827 and given a Classical façade. The cause failed in 1929 and the chapel passed into commercial use.	
Meeting Room	Lewes; 50.8724°N 0.0120°E	Lewes	Brethren	c. 1937	c. 1971	Industrial	A Brethren meeting room was situated on St Nicholas' Lane in the town centre. It was still active in 1963, but its marriage registration (granted in August 1937) was cancelled in February 1971.	
Tabernacle Congregational Church	Lewes; 50.8740°N 0.0155°E	Lewes	Congregational	1816	1954	Commercial (Superdrug)	Close to the bridge across the River Ouse to Cliffe, this landmark building made way for a carpet showroom, in turn replaced in the 1980s by a Superdrug shop. "Classical and grand", it was attended by many important people in the town's history, such as brewer William Harvey. The stuccoed chapel had a four-columned Ionic portico, and was extended twice in the 19th century.	
Turf Chapel	Little Common, Bexhill-on-Sea; 50.8443°N 0.4333°E	Rother	Methodist	1837	c. 1930	Commercial	A temporary building was erected in 1837 on Cooden Sea Road by the founders of Belle Hill Wesleyan Chapel in Bexhill's Old Town area. It was Little Common's first church: the Anglican parish church is five years younger. It was rebuilt in 1859, but the growth of Little Common meant a larger church was needed by the early 20th century. Turf Chapel was sold in 1915 and the proceeds went towards buying the land for the present Little Common Methodist Church.	
St Mark's Church	Magham Down; 50.8815°N 0.2867°E	Wealden	Anglican	1890	c. 1988	Residential	This was a mission room associated with St Mary's Church in Hailsham, in whose parish the hamlet of Magham Down lay. Planning permission to demolish it was granted in 1988.	
Mill Corner Wesleyan Chapel	Mill Corner, Northiam; 50.9821°N 0.5975°E	Rother	Methodist	1882	c. 1965	Residential	This chapel originally stood at Udimore. When a new building was erected there, it was taken down and rebuilt in this hamlet south of Northiam. It went out of use in either 1957 or 1965 along with its Sunday school, which had opened in 1900. The chapel was part of the Ticehurst Methodist Circuit for most of its existence.	
Mott's Mill Chapel	Mott's Mill, Crowborough; 51.0955°N 0.1703°E	Wealden	Baptist	c. 1868	c. 1927		The hamlet of Mott's Mill is on the Crowborough to Groombridge road, 2 miles (3.2 km) from Forest Fold Baptist Chapel in Crowborough. That chapel founded a mission there around 1868 in a wooden structure previously used as a Congregational chapel and hired from that denomination. The cause failed in 1907. Sunday and Wednesday services were held, and the chapel saw additional use in 1897 when Forest Fold was closed for rebuilding.	
Netherfield Congregational Church	Netherfield; 50.9436°N 0.4281°E	Rother	Congregational	1892		Vacant	This hamlet in the parish of Battle had a Congregational chapel as well as its Anglican parish church. Built in 1892 and registered for marriages in May 1905, the chapel was a red-brick and stone building with an entrance set under a pointed arch in a porch. Part of its garden survives on the roadside.	
Christ Church	Newhaven; 50.7933°N 0.0502°E	Lewes	Anglican	1881	1965	Police station	Newhaven's second Anglican church had its own parish. E.P.L. Brock designed it in the Early English Gothic Revival style in 1881. Built of flint and brick with wooden arcading inside, it had an apse and a bellcote with a small spire.	
St Wilfrid's Church	Newhaven; 50.7924°N 0.0565°E	Lewes	Anglican	c. 1928		Vacant	This was opened as the East Side Mission Church, but gained its own parish and was renamed St Wilfrid's Church from 2 June 1932.	
Mission to Seamen Chapel	Newhaven; 50.7939°N 0.0518°E	Lewes	Non-denominational	c. 1890		Charitable organisation (Mencap)	This was built at Newhaven Harbour in the 1890s to serve the spiritual needs of sailors and other harbour workers. It had a bellcote and porch.	
St James's Church	Normans Bay; 50.8263°N 0.3943°E	Wealden	Anglican	1866	1975	Residential	The Duke of Devonshire donated land in this fishing hamlet near Bexhill for a combined school and place of worship. The building, funded by Canon Simpson, cost £176, and another £70 was spent on an extension in 1879 which gave the church an apse. Services ceased in September 1967.	
Congregational Mission Chapel	Old Town, Hastings	Hastings	Congregational	1876			This mission chapel of 1876 was on The Bourne in Hastings Old Town. It was a stuccoed building topped with a pediment.	
Croft Congregational Church	Old Town, Hastings; 50.8583°N 0.5907°E	Hastings	Congregational	1877	1972	Residential (Unicorn House)	The first Congregational (originally Independent) chapel in Hastings, a timber structure with weatherboarding and pointed-arched windows, dated from 1807. Thomas Elworthy built a new Free Renaissance Revival-style building on its site. The first stone was laid on 6 October 1876, and services commenced on 1 May 1877. The red- and yellow-brick building stood until February 1972.	
Red Lake United Reformed Church	Ore; 50.8757°N 0.6097°E	Hastings	United Reformed	1903	1978	Residential	A Congregational chapel to serve Ore village and the northeastern suburbs of Hastings was opened in 1890. A new building on the same site on Grove Road was completed by Henry Ward in 1903. Built of red brick and stone, it was a Free-style interpretation of the Perpendicular Gothic Revival style. Worship continued in the church until 1974 (when its marriage registration, granted in July 1905, was cancelled) or 1976. The name Red Lake United Reformed Church was adopted after the union between the Congregational and Presbyterian Churches in 1972; prior to that its registered name was Redlake [sic] Congregational Church.	
St Wilfrid's Church	Pevensey Bay; 50.8124°N 0.3520°E	Wealden	Anglican	1881	1971	Commercial	Founded and built in 1881-82 by a Mr Cooper, this was an early building in the modest seaside resort of Pevensey Bay. It was of red brick with bands of stonework. The new St Wilfrid's Church was erected on a new site further west on the Eastbourne Road in 1968; a plaque shows the site of its demolished predecessor.	
Plumpton United Reformed Church	Plumpton Green; 50.9372°N 0.0607°W	Lewes	United Reformed	1880	1998	Residential	This red-brick chapel with an entrance porch was built for Congregationalists in 1880. It became a United Reformed church, but closed in 1995.	
St Peter's Church	Punnett's Town; 50.9622°N 0.3133°E	Wealden	Anglican		c. 2007	Residential	This small chapel was in the parish of Heathfield. It was closed before 2004 and demolished around 2007; planning permission for the new house on the site was granted in 2005.	
Christ Church	Ridgewood; 50.9579°N 0.0991°E	Wealden	Anglican	1876	c. 1969	Residential	Ridgewood's Anglican church, dedicated by the Bishop of Chichester on 18 June 1876, was "small, [with] a very church-like appearance" according to contemporary sources. It was a tin tabernacle with lancet windows and a bellcote. R.J. Streatfeild gave the land and some of the money; other funding came from Rev. E.T. Cardale, rector of Uckfield. It closed in 1969.	
Ridgewood Wesleyan Chapel	Ridgewood; 50.9558°N 0.1031°E	Wealden	Methodist	c. 1830		Garages	This small chapel on the road to East Hoathly served Wesleyan Methodists in Ridgewood village south of Uckfield. Opened in about 1830, it became part of the Eastbourne Methodist Circuit in 1871 and was sold in the 1950s.	
Hebron Chapel	Ripe; 50.8688°N 0.1427°E	Wealden	Baptist	1830	c. 1948	Vacant	The Calvinistic Baptist chapel in this hamlet was founded in a farm cottage; a "quaint" red-brick chapel was built in 1830. Access was by steps from the road, and the façade was windowless. It was aligned with the Strict Baptist movement from 1881 until 1920, when it became a Gospel Standard congregation. Closure came in 1948.	
St Columba's Church	St Leonards-on-Sea; 50.8546°N 0.5614°E	Hastings	Presbyterian	1883	1942		J.T. Barker designed this church for the Presbyterian community in St Leonards-on-Sea in 1883. It was in the French Gothic Revival style and was mostly of brick: stone and red brickwork on the outside contrasted with a polychrome brick interior. The church, on the northwest corner of the square, was wrecked by a bomb during World War II.	
Seaford Baptist Chapel	Seaford; 50.7719°N 0.1023°E	Lewes	Baptist	1901	1973	Commercial (Boots)	Seaford's original Baptist church—a red brick and stone structure in the Early English Gothic Revival style—was demolished to make way for commercial redevelopment in 1973. The congregation moved to a newly built church in the East Blatchington area of the town in that year.	
St Agnes' Church	Sheffield Park, Fletching; 50.9933°N 0.0009°W	Lewes	Anglican	1908	c. 1937	Industrial	Sheffield Park House and railway station are near the village of Fletching but are within the extensive parish of Chailey. This iron-built mission chapel was built near the station in 1908 as a chapel of ease to St Peter's Church to serve the area. It apparently closed in the mid-1930s and had disappeared by 1937.	
St James's Church	Silverdale, Hastings; 50.8735°N 0.5528°E	Hastings	Anglican	c. 1877	c. 1935	Car park	This opened in 1877 in the parish of St Mary-in-the-Castle Church in central Hastings. In 1902, after St John the Evangelist's Church was built in the Hollington suburb, St James's Church became a chapel of ease to it.	
St Leonards Congregational Mission Church	Silverhill; 50.8673°N 0.5549°E	Hastings	Congregational	a.-1899	p.-1960	Commercial (Astec House)	Associated with St Leonards-on-Sea Congregational Church, this stood on Sedlescombe Road South until its demolition in the 1960s.	
Yokehurst Chapel (Union Chapel)	South Chailey; 50.9343°N 0.03198°W	Lewes	Independent	1821	c. 1960	Vacant	The return for this chapel in the Government's 1851 census of religious attendance stated that its name was Yokehurst Chapel, it held 125 people and that Sunday school and Sunday afternoon worship attendances were 40 and 80 respectively. Maps from the 19th and 20th centuries show that the name changed to Union Chapel and that the building was disused by 1910. Although geographically in South Chailey, it was within the parish of East Chiltington.	
St John's Church	South Common, Chailey; 50.9399°N 0.0236°W	Lewes	Anglican	1895	c. 1973	Residential	One of two mission chapels in this large parish, this was served from St Peter's Church. It was a simple tin tabernacle on a corner site. It continued to serve the South Common area until its closure in 1973.	
St Joseph's Church	Southover, Burwash; 51.0042°N 0.3630°E	Rother	Roman Catholic	1887	1989	Vacant	Southover, a large house, is in a rural location northwest of Burwash village. A new Roman Catholic church was built more centrally in 1965, but St Joseph's closed only in 1979. The elaborate building had transepts with unusual apsidal ends, substantial brick vaulting and decorative murals. It was Early English Gothic Revival in style, mostly of red brick with some stonework, and the architect was B. Whelan.	
Staplecross Methodist Chapel	Staplecross; 50.9740°N 0.5363°E	Rother	Methodist	1812	1970	Residential	This Methodist chapel served the village of Staplecross for nearly 160 years: it was built in 1812 and extended in 1840. It was a stuccoed structure with lancet windows.	
Twyford Church	Twyford House, Wych Cross; 51.0564°N 0.0027°W	Wealden	Anglican	c. 1910	1958	Vacant	This isolated place of worship was near Twyford House in Ashdown Forest, within the parish of Nutley. The building was part of a school which has also been demolished. It had an apse and a bellcote, and was of brick with some stonework.	
St Anne's Church	Upperton, Eastbourne; 50.7720°N 0.2777°E	Eastbourne	Anglican	1882	1955	Residential	Described at the time of its opening as "the church of ... the aristocratic Upperton district", this large church of flint and red brick was designed by architects Spurrell and Murray. Captain Lawrence Oates sometimes worshipped here, and a memorial was erected inside after his death in the Terra Nova Expedition. The Early English Gothic Revival church was wrecked by bombs in World War II; the ruins were taken down in 1955.	
Upperton Congregational Church (Images)	Upperton, Eastbourne; 50.7745°N 0.2693°E	Eastbourne	Congregational	1885	2019	Vacant pending redevelopment	Congregationalism in Eastbourne originated with services at a hall in 1862, and the town's second permanent Congregational church was built for £1,135 in 1885 in the newly developed Upperton area. When the present church was built next to it in 1901, the brick building became a church hall and lecture theatre. From 2008 it also housed the Eastbourne Montessori Nursery School. It was demolished at the same time as its replacement.	
Upperton United Reformed Church (Images)	Upperton, Eastbourne; 50.7745°N 0.2695°E	Eastbourne	United Reformed Church	1901	2019	Vacant pending redevelopment	In 1901, this turreted red-brick and stone Decorated Gothic church replaced the neighbouring chapel, which became the church hall. The foundation stone was laid on 19 April 1899 and an official opening ceremony was held on 23 May 1900. The final cost was £5,600 (£768,000 as of 2023). In 2015, the Methodist and United Reformed Churches announced plans for a merger between four of their congregations in the town, including Upperton church. Demolition work began on 5 August 2019 and was nearly complete within two months. There are plans to build a new church and community facility on the site, but worship has been consolidated in one of the other churches until this happens.	
St James's Church	Vines Cross; 50.9378°N 0.2665°E	Wealden	Anglican	c. 1918	2007	Residential	Originally a chapel of ease to Waldron, this former gospel hall of 1915 became linked to Christ Church at Horam when that became a parish church. Described as "a rare survival", the building was an unrestored tin tabernacle in its original condition, with vernacular windows and painted iron walls. A tall wooden belfry with a large roof stood next to the church.	
Jubilee Mission Room	Wannock; 50.8093°N 0.2354°E	Wealden	Anglican	1887	1973	Village hall	Villagers in Wannock were distant from the parish church at Jevington until 1887, when a site was acquired for £11.16s.6d (equivalent to £1,660 in 2023) and an iron hall was built for worship and community use. Construction cost £164.1s.10d (equivalent to £23,050 in 2023). Structural decline and the opening of St Wilfrid's Church nearby prompted its closure and demolition in June 1973, and a new village hall was put up instead.	
Halton Kingdom Hall	West Hill, Hastings; 50.8647°N 0.5897°E	Hastings	Jehovah's Witnesses	1974	1998	Residential	This Kingdom Hall had to be demolished in 1998 as it was on the route of Southern Water's new stormwater sewage pipeline. It had been registered in March 1974 and succeeded a Kingdom Hall registered in 1956 in part of a building on Warrior Square, St Leonards-on-Sea. The congregation joined another Kingdom Hall which had been built subsequently in St Leonards-on-Sea.	

== Gallery ==
Pictures of demolished places of worship

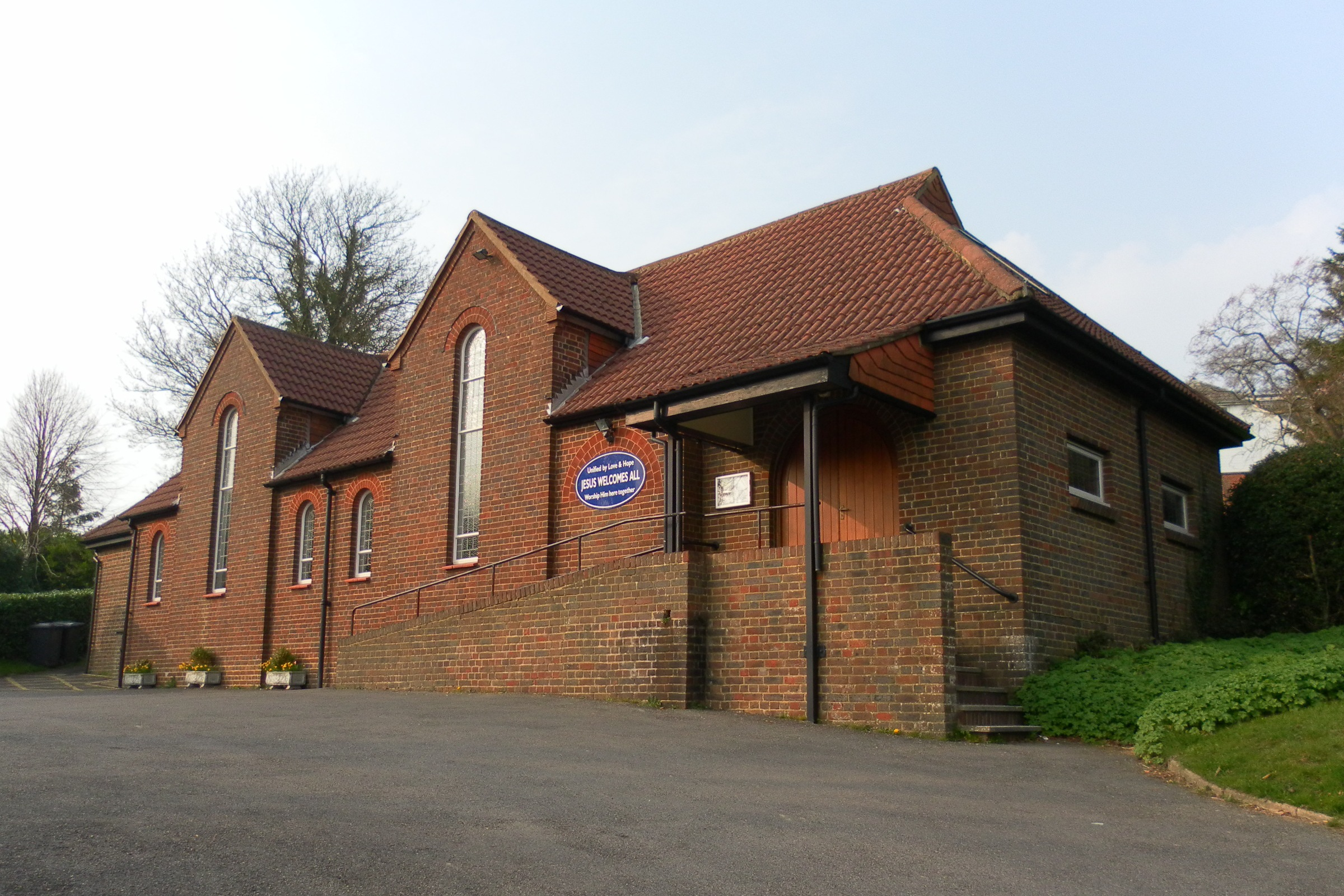
St Catherine's Church served Roman Catholics in the Heathfield area between 1953 and 2014.

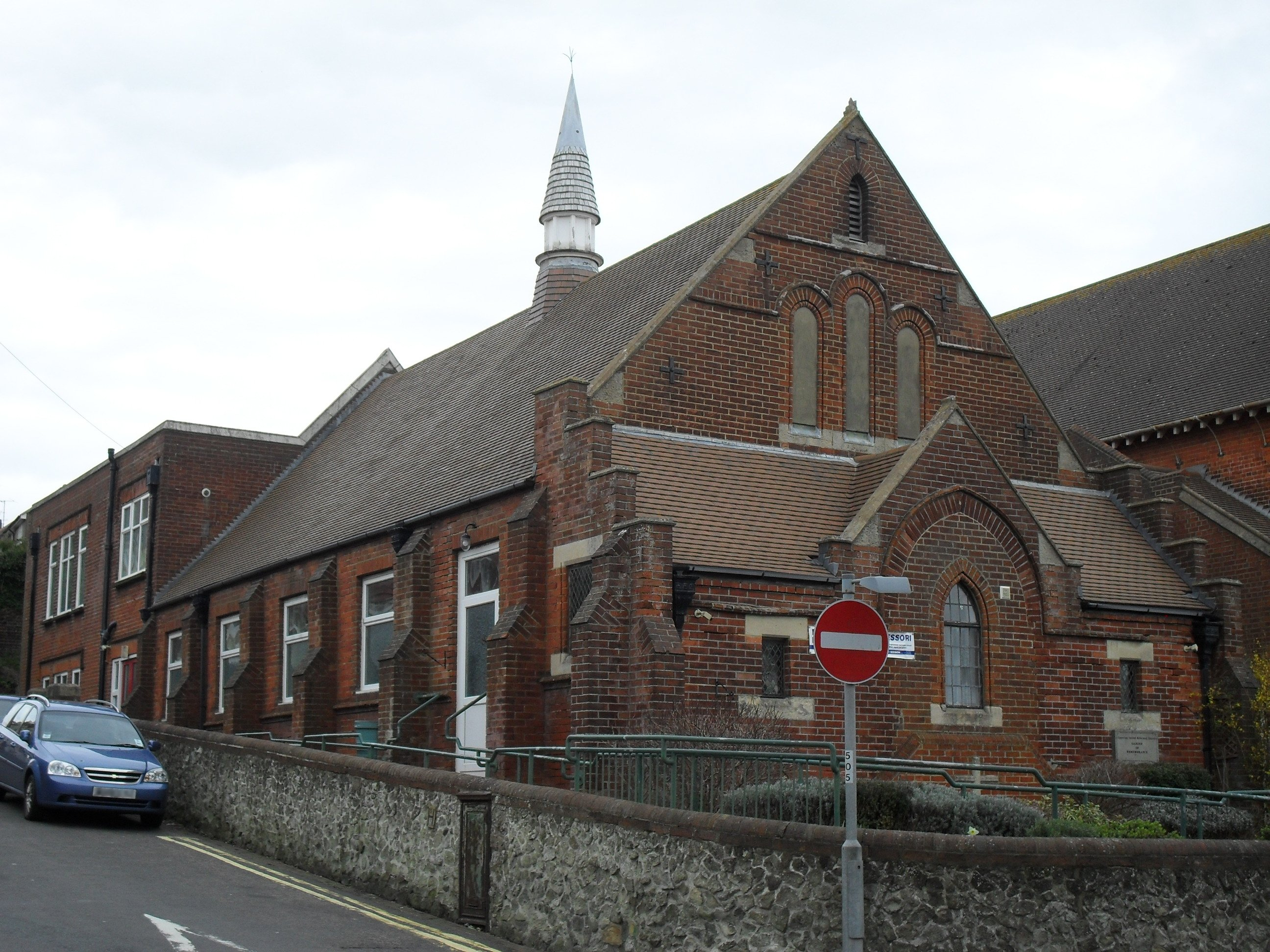
The former Upperton Congregation Church in Eastbourne...

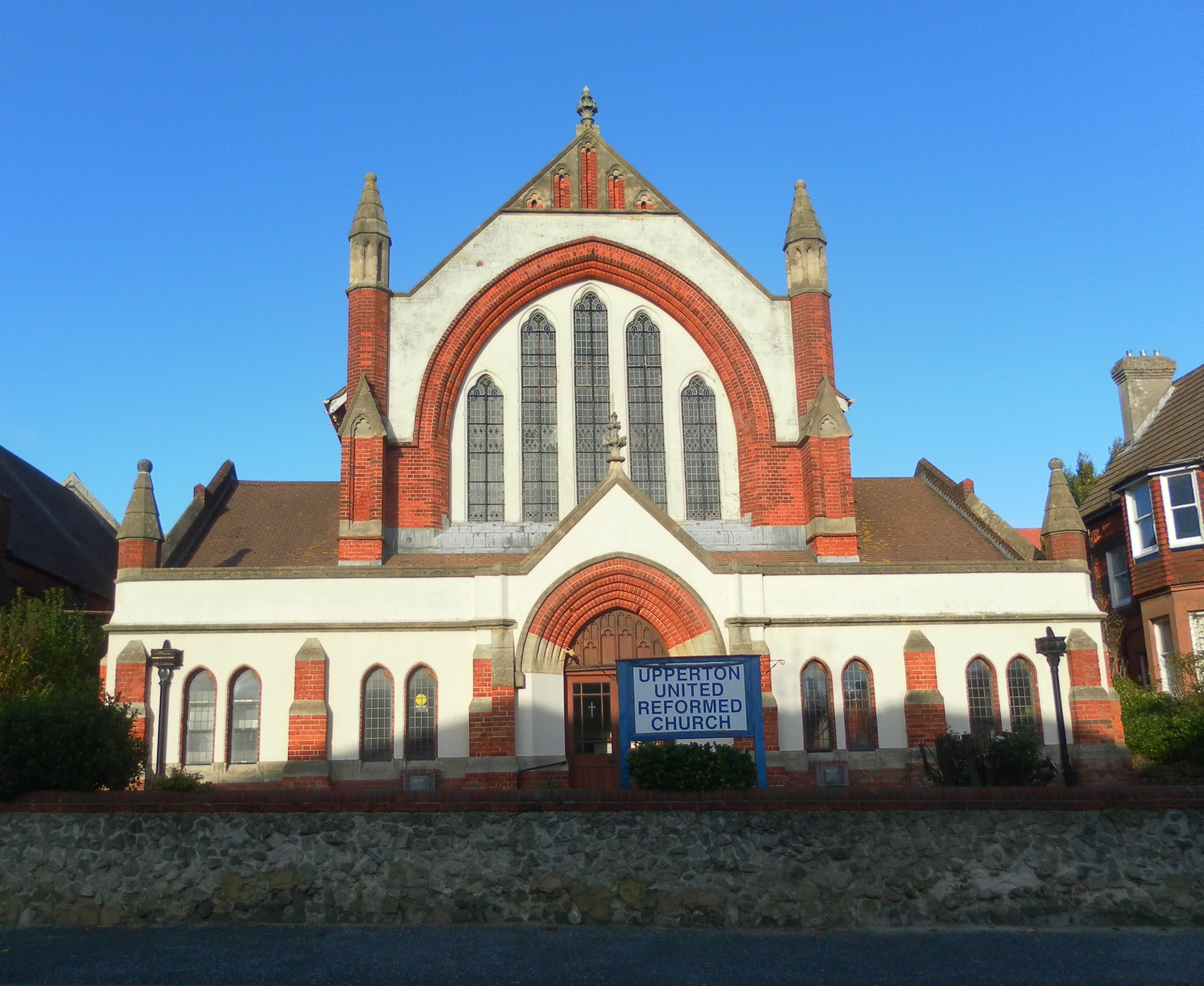
... and its successor, Upperton United Reformed Church, were demolished in 2019.

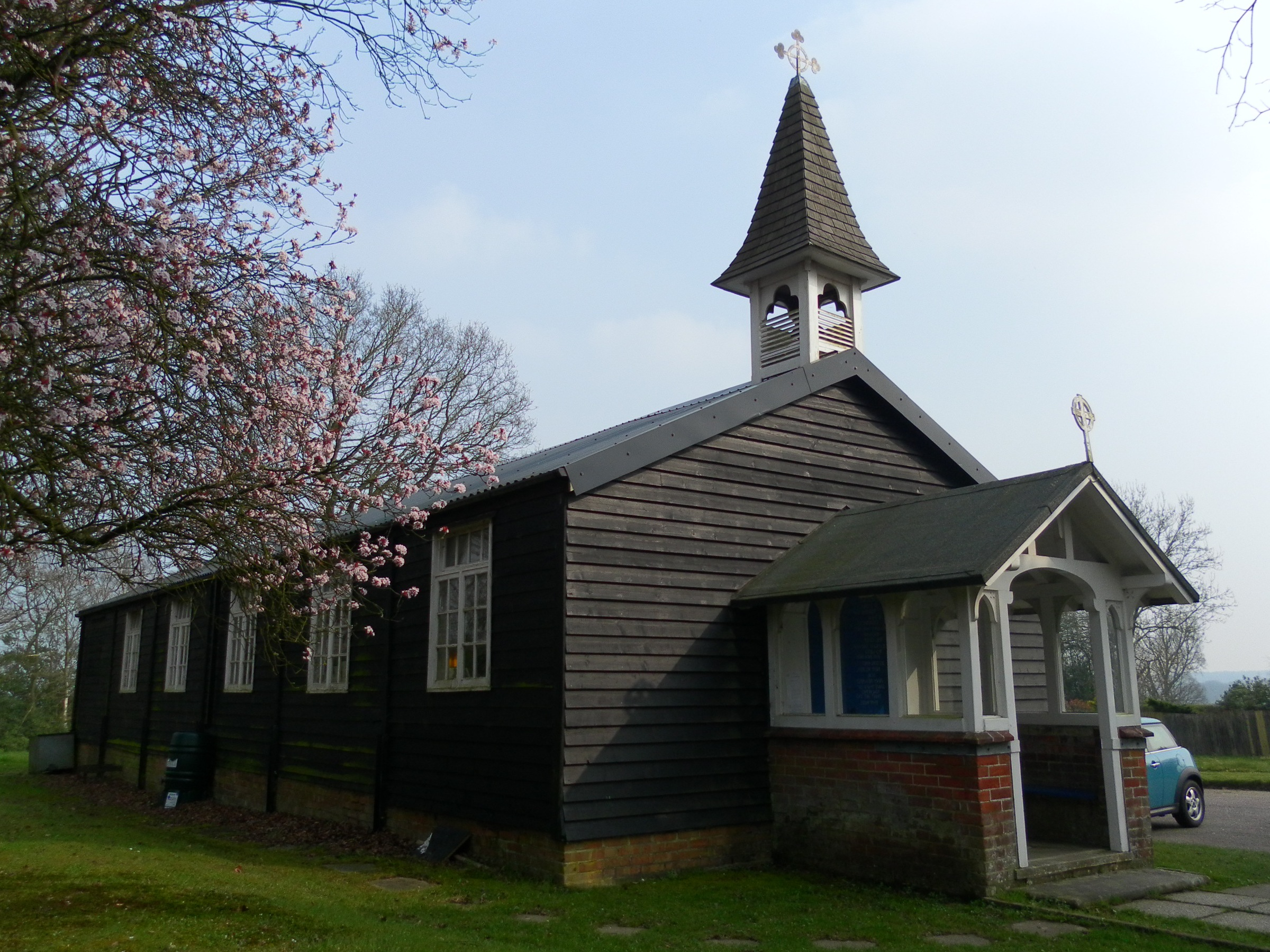
A hospice was built on the site of the Church of the Good Shepherd in Five Ashes in 2017.

== See also ==
- List of demolished places of worship in Brighton and Hove
- List of demolished places of worship in West Sussex
- Media related to demolished places of worship in East Sussex at Wikimedia Commons

== Bibliography ==
- Antram, Nicholas; Pevsner, Nikolaus (2013). Sussex: East with Brighton and Hove. The Buildings of England. London: Yale University Press. ISBN 978-0-300-18473-0.
- Barkshire, John (2000). Burwash: Domesday to Millennium. Burwash: John Barkshire. ISBN 0-9538259-0-6.
- Bartley, L.J. (1971). The Story of Bexhill. Bexhill: F.J.Parsons Ltd.
- Brooker, John (1888). Brooker's Guide and Directory for Uckfield and District. Uckfield: J. Brooker.
- Chambers, Ralph (1953). The Strict Baptist Chapels of England: Sussex. Vol. 2. Thornton Heath: Ralph Chambers.
- Dyer, Enid (1985). The History of Upperton Church. Eastbourne: Upperton United Reformed Church.
- Elleray, D. Robert (1981). The Victorian Churches of Sussex. Chichester: Phillimore & Co. Ltd. ISBN 0-85033-378-4.
- Elleray, D. Robert (2004). Sussex Places of Worship. Worthing: Optimus Books. ISBN 0-9533132-7-1.
- Geering, Cliff (2016). The Cliffe Chapel: A Historical Sketch (PDF). Christ Church, Lewes. (Lecture on the 200th Anniversary of the Tabernacle congregation)
- Hague, Graham; Hague, Judy (1986). The Unitarian Heritage: An Architectural Survey (1st ed.). Sheffield: Unitarian Heritage. ISBN 0-9511081-0-7.
- Homan, Roger (1997). "Mission and Fission: the organization of Huntingtonian and Calvinistic Baptist causes in Sussex in the 18th and 19th centuries". Sussex Archaeological Collections. 135. Lewes: Sussex Archaeological Society: 265–282. doi:10.5284/1085045. ISSN 0143-8204.
- Littleton, Ebenezer (1898). A History of the Rise, Progress and Present Position of the Forest Fold Baptist Chapel, Crowborough. London: F. Kirby.
- Marchant, Rex (2004). Hastings: a History and Celebration. Teffont: Frith Book Co Ltd. ISBN 1-904938-31-0.
- Payne, Malcolm (1985). Crowborough: the Growth of a Wealden Town. Studley: K.A.F. Brewin Books. ISBN 0-947731-04-0.
- Porter, Julian (2004). Bexhill-on-Sea: A History. Chichester: Phillimore & Co Ltd. ISBN 1-86077-295-1.
- Salzman, L.F. (1901). The history of the parish of Hailsham: the abbey of Otham and the priory of Michelham. Lewes: Farncombe & Co Ltd.
- Stell, Christopher (1999). Paul Corbey Finney (ed.). Seeing Beyond the Word: Visual Arts and the Calvinist Tradition. Grand Rapids: William B. Eerdmans Publishing Company. ISBN 0-8028-3860-X.
- Stell, Christopher (2002). Nonconformist Chapels and Meeting-houses in Eastern England. Swindon: English Heritage. ISBN 1-873592-50-7.
- The Friends of Lewes Society (2002). Lewes 1952–2002: Fifty years of change. Lewes: Pomegranate Press. ISBN 0-9542587-2-X.
- Various authors (1978). 175 Years of Methodism in Eastbourne 1803–1978. Eastbourne: Eastbourne Methodist Circuit.
- Vickers, John A., ed. (1989). The Religious Census of Sussex 1851. Lewes: Sussex Record Society. ISBN 085445-036-X.
- Wilkins, Amanda (2000). Pevensey & Wallsend: a History of Pevensey and Pevensey Bay. Lewes: The Book Guild Ltd. ISBN 1-85776-560-5.
- Wilcox, Antony (2004). National Index of Parish Registers, Vol. 4, Part2: Sussex. London: Society of Genealogists. ISBN 1-903462-83-5.
- s.n. (1933). The Story of Crowborough. Tunbridge Wells: Courier Co. Ltd.
