= Horam (disambiguation) =

Horam may have the following meanings

- Horam, a village in the Weald of Sussex.
- John Horam (1939-2026), a British politician and Member of Parliament
- Horam, a name that appears in the Bible, meaning 'their hill'.
- HoRam, a sometimes used nickname for pitcher Horacio Ramírez
