= Rehoboth Chapel, Pell Green =

Church in East Sussex, England

Rehoboth Chapel
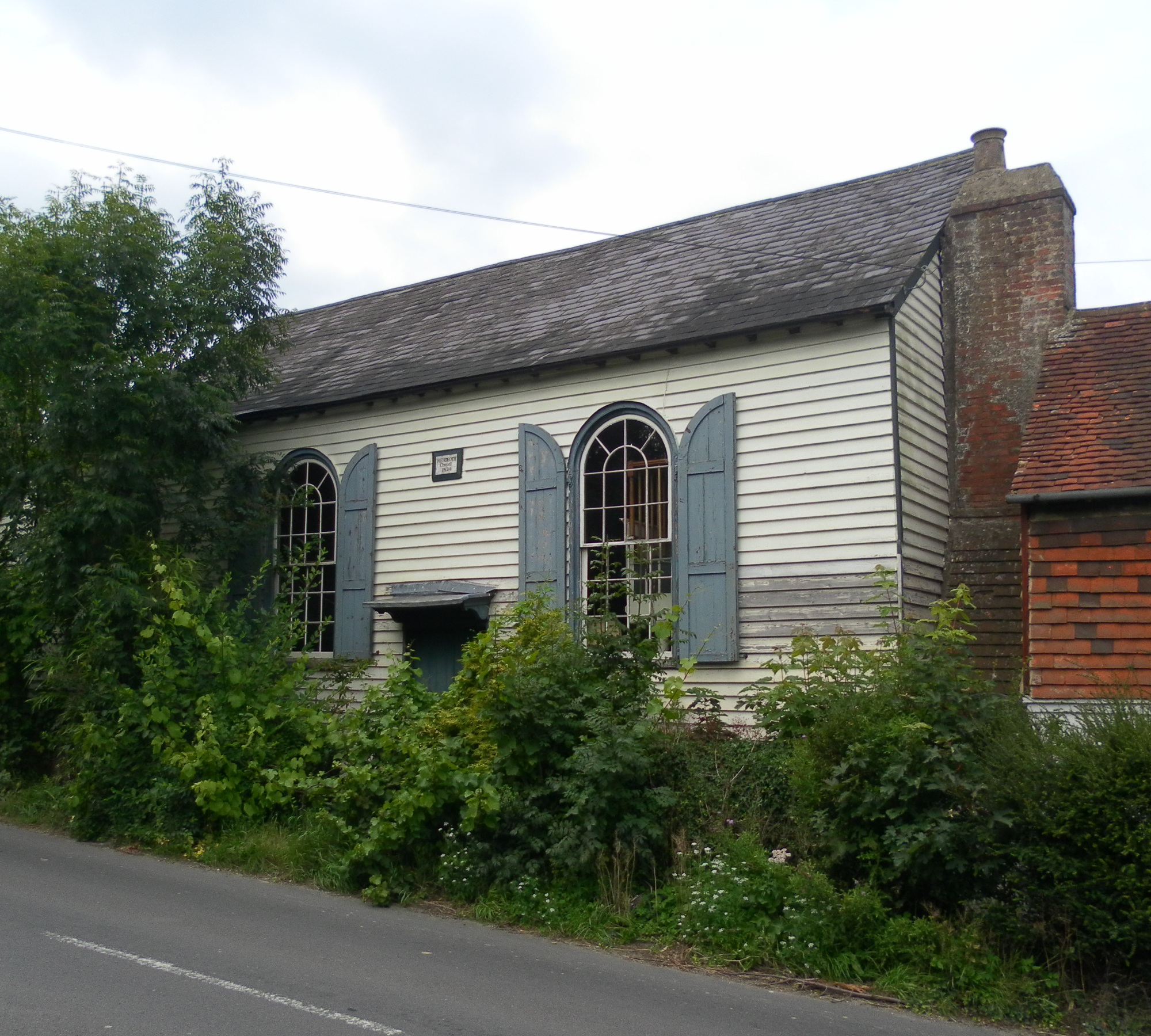
- The former chapel from the southeast
- Rehoboth Chapel
- 51.0738°N 0.3472°E
- OS grid reference: TQ 64531 33120
- Location: Cousley Wood Road, Pell Green, Wadhurst, East Sussex TN5 6EF
- Country: England
- Denomination: Baptist

History
- Status: Former chapel
- Founded: 1818
- Founder: Thomas Kemp

Architecture
- Functional status: Residential conversion
- Heritage designation: Grade II
- Designated: 12 April 1978
- Style: Vernacular
- Completed: 1824
- Closed: 1980s

Rehoboth Chapel is a former Strict Baptist place of worship in the hamlet of Pell Green in East Sussex, England. Pell Green is in the parish of Wadhurst in Wealden, one of six local government districts in the English county of East Sussex, and stands on the road between the market town of Wadhurst and the village of Lamberhurst in the county of Kent. Built in 1824 to replace an earlier meeting place for local Baptists, it continued in religious use until the late 20th century. The weatherboarded building—now a house—is of a similar design to another Baptist chapel at nearby Shover's Green. The building is Grade II listed.

== History ==
Pell Green, one of several tiny settlements in Wadhurst's parish, is about 0.75 miles (1.2 km) northeast of the town. In common with many places in Sussex, a county known for its broad range of Christian denominations, a Strict Baptist community developed in the early 19th century. Their first meetings in Pell Green were held in 1818. Six years later, Thomas Kemp founded and built a new chapel immediately to the west of an existing cottage to serve the community. It was successful enough to require regular extensions in its early years; work was carried out in 1828, 1831 and 1841. The original three-bay east–west layout gained a fourth bay to the west, and a lean-to was subsequently attached to this.

Over the years, many memorials in various forms were installed in the chapel, and formed its most important feature. The earliest, dated 1836, commemorated a local woman and was added to as more family members died. In 1844, a memorial to a member of the Kemp family was placed on the south wall; again, more names were added later. Most memorials were in the form of painted wooden boards, although there were also some stone slabs and headstones. Immersion baptism took place in a stream nearby.

The religious census of Sussex in 1851 recorded that the "Rehoboth Calvinistic Baptist Chapel" had 500 sittings, all of which were free; and attendances at morning and afternoon services were given as 235 and 300 respectively. Attendances declined in the 20th century, and in 1986 conversion to a house was suggested. This happened soon afterwards, and the building is still in residential use. Some changes have been made, such as the removal of original shutters on the south-facing windows. The chapel's registration for the solemnisation of marriages was formally cancelled by the General Register Office in March 1980.

The Rehoboth Chapel was Grade II listed on 12 April 1978.

== Architecture ==
The chapel is a weatherboarded single-storey building with timber-framed walls and a slate-tiled roof with eaves. The construction date of 1824 is visible on a stone on the exterior. The three original bays have, from east to west, a large round-arched window, a doorway with a straight hood mould, and another window in the same style. The westernmost bay has an identical window and a small door, again flat-hooded. The windows are sashes and originally had wooden shutters.

The building was mostly of timber construction inside. A three-sided gallery was held up by wooden columns with decorative mouldings at the top and bottom, and three king posts supported the roof (two in the original part of the chapel and one in the western extension). The extension is given further structural stability by five iron columns on the north side. Seven burial vaults with brick walls survive underneath the chapel.

== See also ==
- List of former places of worship in Wealden

== Bibliography ==
- Beevers, David; Marks, Richard; Roles, John (1989). Sussex Churches and Chapels. Brighton: The Royal Pavilion, Art Gallery and Museums. ISBN 0-948723-11-4.
- Elleray, D. Robert (2004). Sussex Places of Worship. Worthing: Optimus Books. ISBN 0-9533132-7-1.
- Nairn, Ian; Pevsner, Nikolaus (1965). The Buildings of England: Sussex. Harmondsworth: Penguin Books. ISBN 0-14-071028-0.
- Stell, Christopher (2002). Nonconformist Chapels and Meeting-houses in Eastern England. Swindon: English Heritage. ISBN 1-873592-50-7.
- Vickers, John A., ed. (1989). The Religious Census of Sussex 1851. Lewes: Sussex Record Society. ISBN 085445-036-X.
