= Walter Murray =

Walter Murray may refer to:

- Walter Charles Murray, president of the University of Saskatchewan, 1908–1937
  - Walter Murray Collegiate, high school in Saskatoon, Saskatchewan, Canada
- Walter J. C. Murray, British nature writer and photographer
- Walter Murray (gridiron football), American football player
- Walter Murray (governor), governor of Västmanland County, Sweden, 1916–1937
- Walter Murray (Quebec colonial politician) (c. 1701-1772)
- Walter Murray (printer, lawyer) (1826–1875), involved in the Rancho San Juan Capistrano Murders
