= Vines Cross =

Village in East Sussex, England

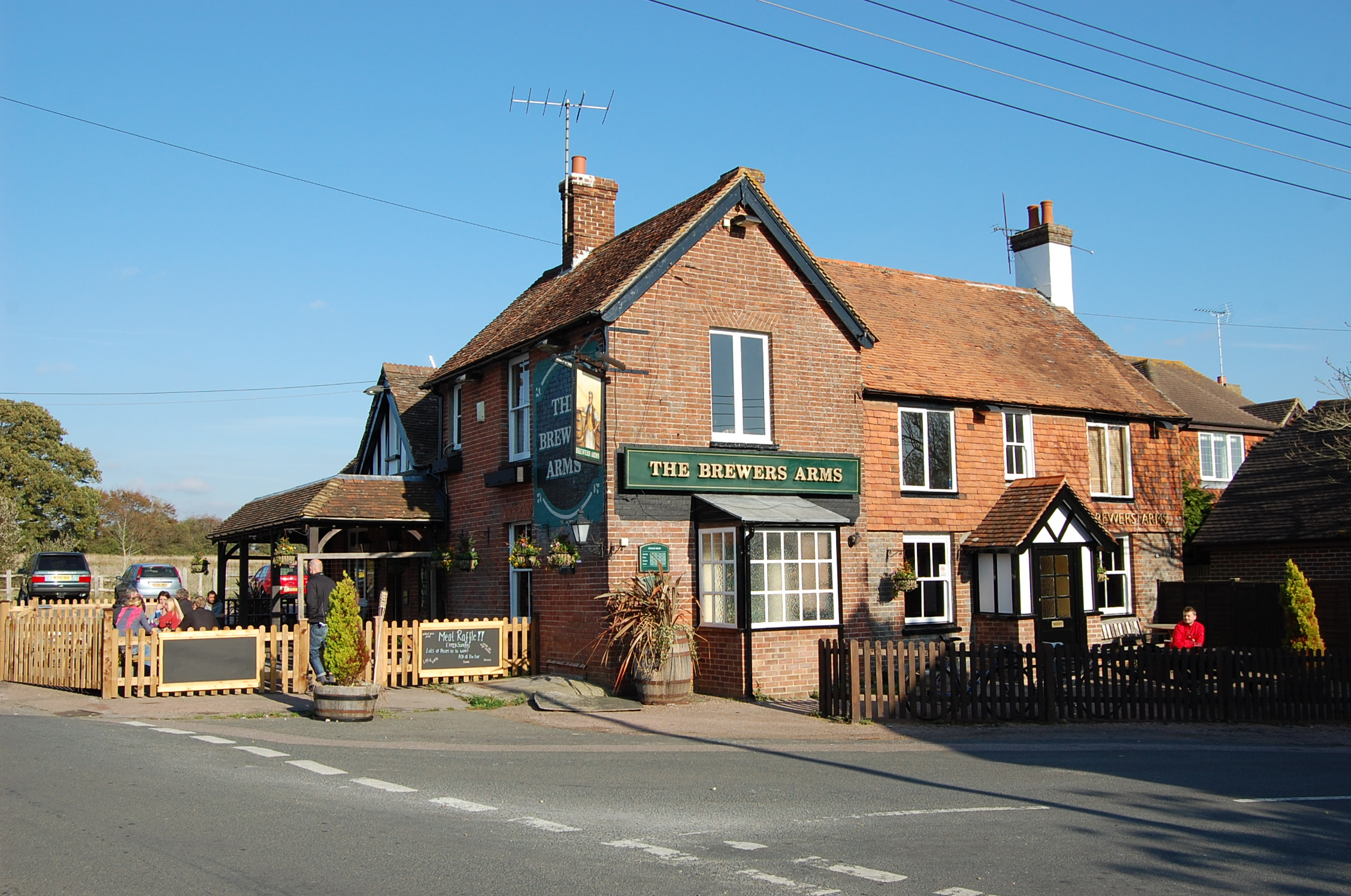
- The Brewer's Arms

- Location within East Sussex
- Civil parish: Horam
- District: Wealden
- Shire county: East Sussex
- Region: South East
- Country: England
- Sovereign state: United Kingdom
- Post town: Heathfield
- Postcode district: TN21
- Police: Sussex
- Fire: East Sussex
- Ambulance: South East Coast
- UK Parliament: Wealden

Vines Cross is a hamlet in the Wealden district of East Sussex, England. It is 2.7 miles from the market town of Heathfield.

This dormitory village once had a thriving school, bakers, post office, church and grocers, but now only has a public house (The Brewers Arms) and a garage. 50.93705°N 0.26747°E

The village also has a bonfire society, which was founded in 1996, named after the village. They attend carnivals and bonfires around Sussex. They used to hold celebrations within the village but in recent years only attend others events, wearing their skull and cross bones.
