= Wych Cross =

Village in East Sussex, England

Coordinates: 51.06933°N 0.02504°E

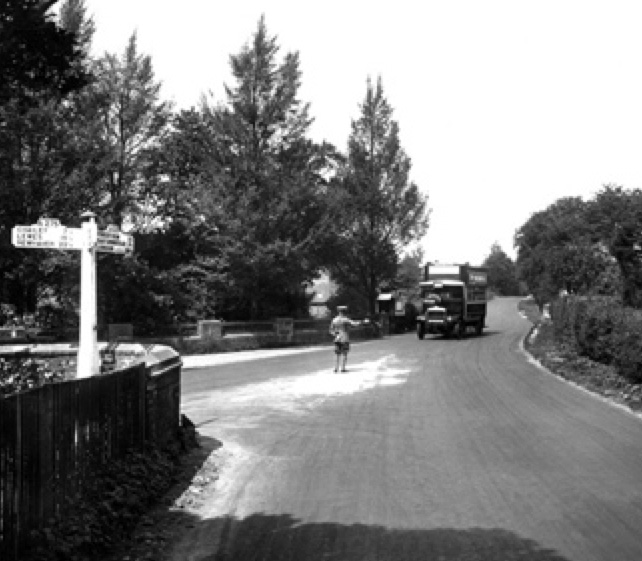
Wych Cross

Wych Cross is a location in Ashdown Forest, in the Wealden district of East Sussex. It lies on the sandstone forest ridge of the High Weald on the principal road from London to the east Sussex county town of Lewes at an elevated crossroads where it meets a road running east to west along the High Weald forest ridge. Wych Cross is situated about 36 miles south of London, roughly midway between London and the English Channel.

The etymology of the place name (also spelt 'Wytch Cross' and 'Witch Cross' in documents of the early 19th century and earlier) is uncertain. "Wych" could be a variant of the common Old English placename "wic", denoting a homestead or settlement, it could possibly refer to a tree, the wych-elm, or it could refer to St. Richard de Wych, Bishop of Chichester.

In the late 19th century a church dedicated to St. Richard de Wych was built east of Wych Cross by the then owner of the Ashdown Park estate, Thomas Charles Thompson, but it was never consecrated, and it was demolished in the 1970s.

The Ashdown Forest Centre, the head office of the Conservators of Ashdown Forest, is situated at Wych Cross just half a mile east of the crossroads. It is housed in three historic Wealden barns—an Administration Barn, Information Barn (visitor centre) and Education Barn—that were conveyed to the site and rebuilt there in the early 1980s.

Notable buildings at Wych Cross include the present hotel building (including a deconsecrated chapel containing eight Harry Clarke stained glass windows) at Ashdown Park, and Wych Cross Place, built around 1900.

A hymn tune named "WYCH CROSS" was composed by Erik Routley, who was born in Brighton, about 20 miles south of Wych Cross.

In various DC Comics (notably Neil Gaiman's The Sandman) Wych Cross was the location of Fawney Rig, the Sussex manor house originally owned by John Constantine's ancestor Lady Johanna, and later by Roderick Burgess; and in which Dream was imprisoned for decades, along with the nearby old people's home in which Burgess's son, Alex, becomes a resident.
