= Maynard's Green =

Village in East Sussex, England

Coordinates: 50.94600°N 0.25022°E

Maynard's Green is a village in the Wealden district of East Sussex.
