= Shover's Green Baptist Chapel =

Former church in East Sussex, England

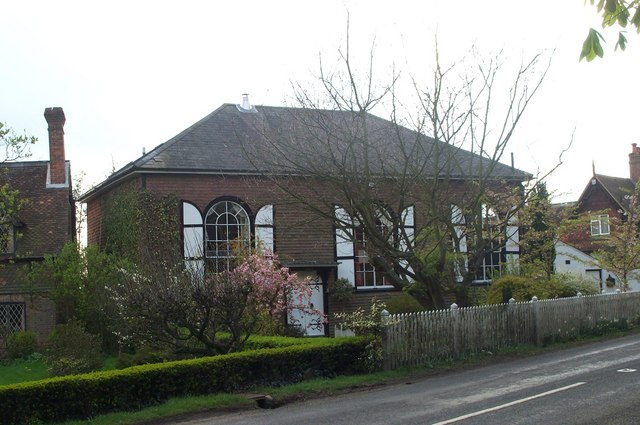
- The chapel from the northeast
- Shover's Green Baptist Chapel
- 51.0500°N 0.3566°E
- Location: Lower High Street, Shover's Green, Wadhurst, East Sussex TN5 6NE
- Country: England
- Denomination: Baptist

History
- Status: Former chapel
- Founded: 1816

Architecture
- Functional status: Residential conversion
- Heritage designation: Grade II
- Designated: 12 April 1978
- Style: Vernacular
- Completed: 1817
- Closed: c. 1973

Shover's Green Baptist Chapel is a former Strict Baptist place of worship in the hamlet of Shover's Green in East Sussex, England. Shover's Green is in Wealden, one of six local government districts in the English county of East Sussex, and stands on the road between the market town of Wadhurst and the village of Ticehurst in the neighbouring district of Rother. Founded by Strict Baptists from nearby Burwash in 1816, the chapel—one of three Baptist places of worship in Wadhurst parish—continued to serve the community until the 1970s, when it was sold for conversion to a house. Its design is similar to that of the nearby Rehoboth Chapel at Pell Green. The chapel is protected as a Grade II Listed building.

== History ==
Shover's Green is on the Wadhurst–Ticehurst road about 2.25 miles (3.6 km) west of the latter. It is also close to Burwash, a village which had a growing congregation of Strict and Particular Baptists in the early 19th century (reflecting the prevalence of Protestant Nonconformity in the county of Sussex as a whole). In November 1815, 24 members of Providence Chapel in Burwash left to found an additional chapel at Shover's Green. Work started in March 1816, and the building was ready in 1817. A Baptist congregation had existed in Wadhurst itself since 1815—it later moved into a former Methodist chapel, and stopped meeting in the 1930s— and Rehoboth Chapel was built in a similar style to the Shover's Green church in 1824. (The chapel at Burwash, now vanished, was also associated with the founding in 1842 of Bethel Chapel at nearby Robertsbridge.) The religious census of Sussex in 1851 recorded that the chapel had 400 sittings, 100 of which were free; and attendances at morning, afternoon and evening services were given as 205, 386 and 87 respectively. The morning and afternoon services were also attended by 47 and 49 Sunday school children respectively. Describing the details of the chapel's founding in the census return, minister James Jones stated: "Before this chapel was erected the congregation assembled for four or five years in a building near this place, belonging to a certain person, but the building being found too small, and not belonging to this congregation, they had the present one erected".

The chapel was renovated in 1876, when the original weatherboarding and timber framing was replaced by brickwork and tiles. As the congregation declined in the late 20th century, the building fell out of religious use, was closed in about 1973 and was converted into a house. Its registration for the solemnisation of marriages was formally cancelled by the General Register Office in March 1980.

Shover's Green Baptist Chapel was designated a Grade II listed building on 12 April 1978.

== Architecture ==
The chapel is a single-storey building with a regular three-bay façade. It has a slate-tiled hipped roof and timber-framed walls with brickwork and tiles in place of the original weatherboarding, still in situ at the nearby Pell Green chapel. The plain façade, facing northeast, has three equally spaced windows with round heads and wooden shutters. The double doorway, between the left and middle windows, has a flat canopy; another door to the right is a later addition, as is a lean-to structure (originally housing a vestry) on the northwest side. In the "nicely furnished interior", a "rather high" pulpit originally stood between two windows in the rear wall. The roof has a bracketed cornice.

== See also ==
- List of former places of worship in Wealden

== Bibliography ==
- Chambers, Ralph (1953). The Strict Baptist Chapels of England: Sussex. Vol. 2. Thornton Heath: Ralph Chambers.
- Elleray, D. Robert (2004). Sussex Places of Worship. Worthing: Optimus Books. ISBN 0-9533132-7-1.
- Nairn, Ian; Pevsner, Nikolaus (1965). The Buildings of England: Sussex. Harmondsworth: Penguin Books. ISBN 0-14-071028-0.
- Stell, Christopher (2002). Nonconformist Chapels and Meeting-houses in Eastern England. Swindon: English Heritage. ISBN 1-873592-50-7.
- Vickers, John A., ed. (1989). The Religious Census of Sussex 1851. Lewes: Sussex Record Society. ISBN 085445-036-X.
