= Wadhurst =

Town in East Sussex, England

Coordinates: 51°03′58″N 0°19′48″E

- Market town and civil parish
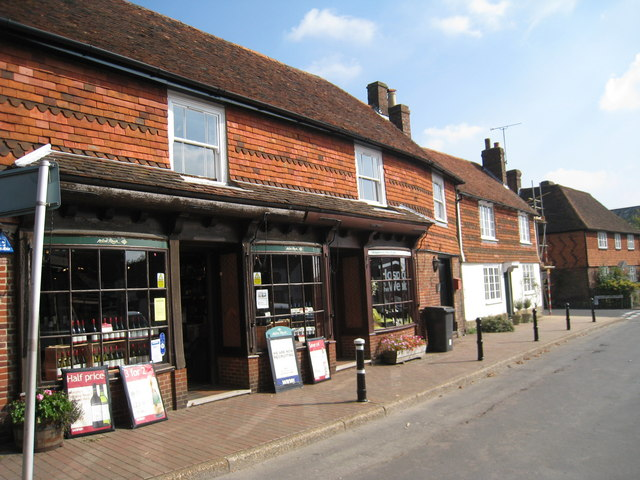
- Shops on Church Street

- Flag of Wadhurst

- Location within East Sussex
- Area: 40.1 km^{2} (15.5 sq mi)
- Population: 4,906 (2021 Census)
  - Density: 311/sq mi (120/km^{2})
- OS grid reference: TQ640318
  - London: 36 miles (58 km) NNW
- District: Wealden
- Shire county: East Sussex
- Region: South East
- Country: England
- Sovereign state: United Kingdom
- Post town: WADHURST
- Postcode district: TN5
- Dialling code: 01892
- Police: Sussex
- Fire: East Sussex
- Ambulance: South East Coast
- UK Parliament: Sussex Weald
- Website: Wadhurst Parish Council

Wadhurst is a market town and civil parish in East Sussex, England. It is the centre of the civil parish of Wadhurst, which also includes the hamlets of Cousley Wood and Tidebrook. It is approximately 26 miles (42 km) northeast of Brighton, 21 miles (34 km) north-northeast of Eastbourne, and 19 miles (31 km) north-northwest of Hastings. It had a population of 4,906 at the 2021 census.

== Geography ==
Wadhurst is situated on the Kent–Sussex border seven miles (11 km) east of Crowborough and about seven miles (11 km) south of Royal Tunbridge Wells. Other nearby settlements include Ticehurst, Burwash, Mayfield and Heathfield in East Sussex, and Lamberhurst, Hawkhurst and Cranbrook in Kent.

Physically, Wadhurst lies on a high ridge of the Weald – a range of wooded hills running across Sussex and Kent between the North Downs and the South Downs. The reservoir of Bewl Water is nearby. The River Bewl, which is a sub-tributary of the River Medway, and the Limden rise within the civil parish of Wadhurst.

== History ==
The name Wadhurst (Wadeherst in early records) is Anglo-Saxon and most probably derives from Wada which is believed to be the name of a Saxon tribe which occupied the area and began the clearing of the forests in the 7th or 8th century. There is an Anglo-Saxon manor known as Bivelham which lay between the parishes of Wadhurst and Mayfield.

Although Wadhurst was almost certainly in existence at the time of the Domesday survey in 1086, it was part of the Archbishop of Canterbury's land and was therefore not mentioned. The earliest record relating to the area is a reference in the Cartulary of Battle Abbey to "Snape in the parish of Wadhurst".

Henry III granted Wadhurst its charter in 1253, allowing Wadhurst to hold a market every Saturday and a fair on 29 June, the feast of St Peter and St Paul.

In the 16th, 17th and 18th centuries Wadhurst, as did many towns and villages in the Weald, had a thriving iron industry. Two of the large Georgian buildings on the High Street, Hill House and The Old Vicarage, were both ironmasters' houses, along with a number of other large houses on the outskirts of Wadhurst. In the church of St Peter and St. Paul there are several iron ledger-stone memorials of ironmasters, which are unique to this area.

During the First World War, Wadhurst lost 149 men, out of a total village population of 3,500. The worst losses were during the Battle of Aubers Ridge, when 25 men from Wadhurst were killed in one day: nearly 80% of the men from Wadhurst who went into no man's land that day. Wadhurst is now actively twinned with Aubers.

In March 2023, Wadhurst was named by The Sunday Times as the best place to live in the United Kingdom.

=== 1956 air incident ===
On Friday 20 January 1956 at 3.15pm a Gloster Meteor night fighter WS661 crashed into the middle of the town, which killed a 57 year old woman, and a 74 year old male. from RAF North Luffenham. The Meteor aircraft should not have been anywhere near Wadhurst, and was not authorised to be over 60 miles from Rutland.

== Governance ==
Wadhurst is situated in the ward of Frant & Wadhurst. The population of this ward at the 2021 census was 6,941.

== Buildings and people ==
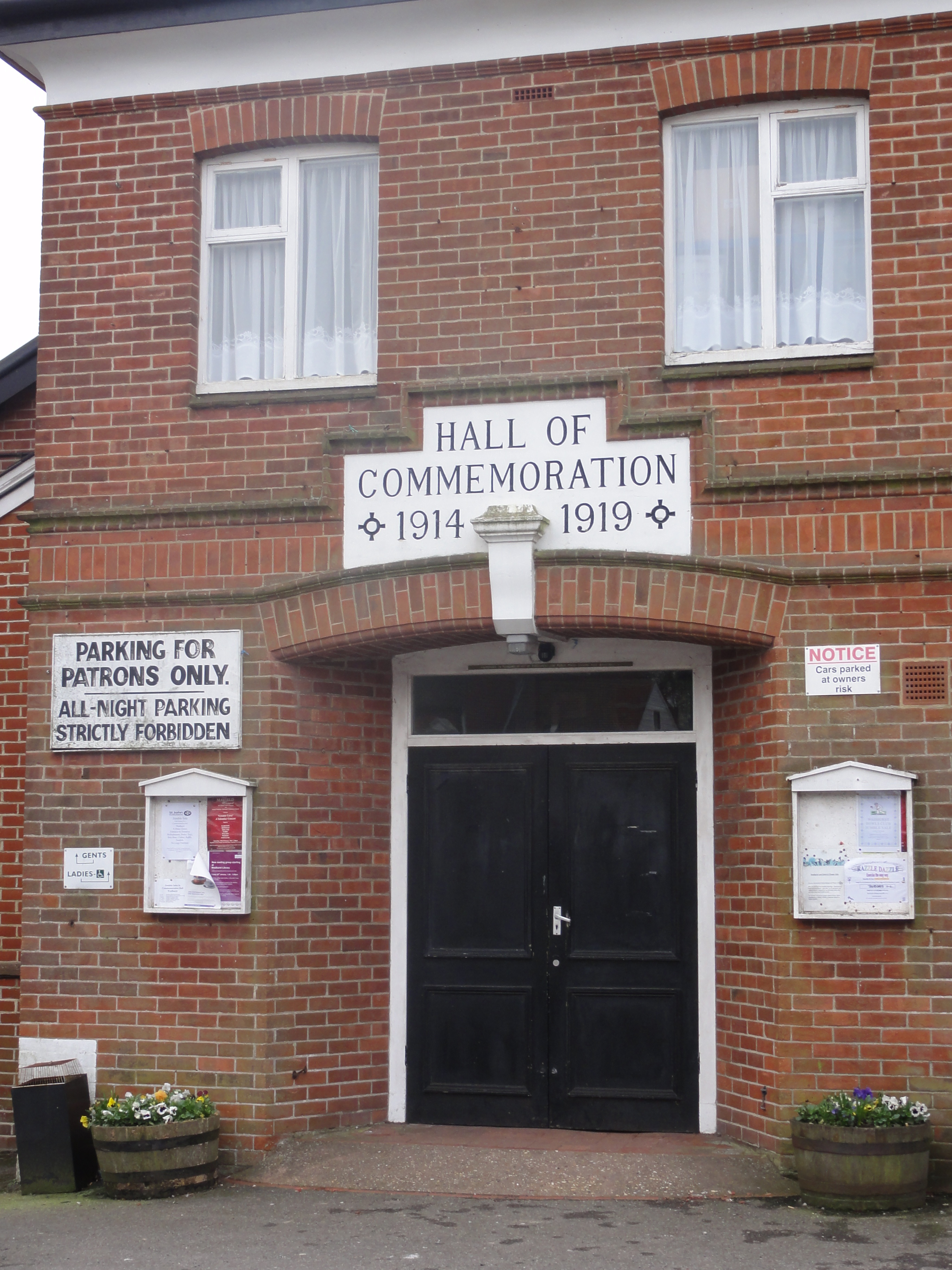
Hall of Commemoration on High Street.

Wadhurst is a small market town, and has kept a very good range of shops considering its size. It has a traditional butcher, baker, ironmonger, hairdresser, bank, post office, gift shop, and several pubs.

There are three buildings of particular architectural interest in the town itself, and a number of old manor houses and farms nearby. There are two early Georgian houses on the High Street, the Old Vicarage and Hill House. On the outskirts is the 19th-century Wadhurst Castle.

The rest of the town is in a variety of vernacular styles, from the 13th century onwards; and little in the centre of the town is very modern apart from a range of shops which replaced the Queens Head Hotel, demolished in the crash of a Gloster Meteor in January 1956 in which four people were killed. Church Street contains a row of 13th- and 14th-century cottages which are reputed to be the oldest properties in Wadhurst. Some apparently were built as a cloister to St. Peters and St. Paul's Church.

== Churches ==
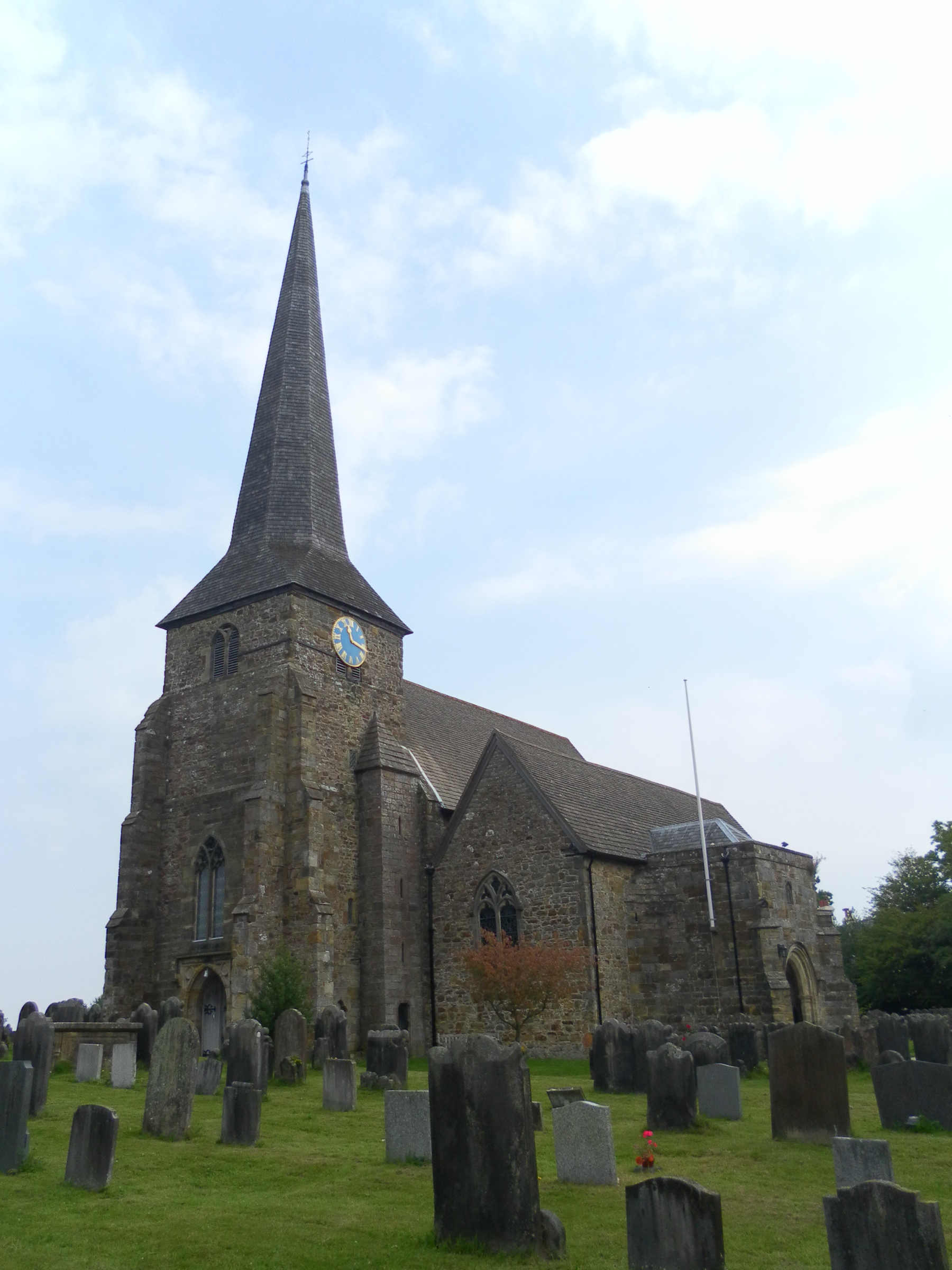
The church of St Peter and St Paul

The Church of St. Peter and St. Paul dominates the centre of the town. Wadhurst's heritage as a centre of the iron industry is shown by the many iron gravestones in the churchyard. The church is medieval and includes work from the 12th to the 15th centuries; there is a shingled spire and a vaulted porch. There is little of interest inside apart from 30 inscribed iron tomb slabs dating from 1614 to 1790.

Wadhurst Methodist Church is no longer used as a church. There is a Catholic church in Mayfield Lane attached to the Sacred Heart School. The churches participate in Churches Together, an interdenominational organisation, along with St John the Baptist, an Anglican church in Tidebrook, and St Peter in Stonegate.

There are also two early 19th-century former Strict Baptist chapels of similar design in the hamlets of Pell Green (Rehoboth Chapel) and Shover's Green (the Shover's Green Baptist Chapel). Both are listed at Grade II.

== Education ==
Wadhurst has two schools in the state-maintained sector: a Church of England primary school (with a nursery) in Sparrow's Green and Uplands Academy, a secondary school. The latter also has an affiliated youth and community centre. In addition, in Mayfield Lane there is an independent Catholic preparatory school, Sacred Heart. Wadhurst also used to be the site of Bellerbys College (formerly known as Wadhurst College and Micklefield Wadhurst), a private girls' school on Mayfield Lane that has been defunct since about 2004.

== Transport ==
The Victorian era saw the town expand towards the new railway station, about 1.5 miles (2.4 km) north of the town. The station, the highest in southern England, is on the line from London Charing Cross to Hastings via Tunbridge Wells, and was opened in 1851 by the South Eastern Railway. The resulting expansion brought the hamlets of Sparrow's Green, Turners Green and Best Beech Hill into the town. In addition to the railway, there are buses to Tunbridge Wells, Crowborough and Hastings, as well as community transport and 'rail link' buses to Ticehurst and Mayfield.

== Wadhurst United F.C. ==
Wadhurst United F.C. (based at the Recreation Ground, South View Road) is Wadhurst's local football team. They were formed in 1890 and joined the Sussex County League Division Three in 2004. They left the league after the 2005–06 season, to rejoin the East Sussex Football League. The club won the East Sussex League Division Two title in the 2008–09 season.

== Twin towns ==
Wadhurst is twinned with:

Aubers, Nord, France.

== Notable people ==
- Jeff Beck, guitarist, lived in Wadhurst between summer 1975 and his death on 10 January 2023. His large stone country house dates to 1591.
- William Bidlake, (1861–1938), architect, moved to Wadhurst in 1924 and practised there until his death.
- Caroline Augusta Foley Rhys Davids, Pāli language scholar and translator
- Davina McCall, television presenter, lived at Faircrouch House in Wadhurst until 2019.
- Irfan Orga (1908–1970), exiled Turkish writer, lived at Spike Island, Wadhurst, 1961–1970.
- Hans Rausing (1926–2019), billionaire inheritor of Tetra Pak, had a house and deer park at Wadhurst. Wadhurst Park continues to be owned by the Rausing family.
- Seymour Whinyates, a British violinist, died in Wadhurst, 1979.
- William Strutt (1862-1915), Born in a family of artists in Teignmouth, Devon in 1862. William moved to Australia where he married, later returning to England in 1862, settling in Wadhurst. William died in Wadhurst on 3 January 1915.
