= Walter J. C. Murray =

- Born: 1900
- Died: 1985 (aged 84–85)
- Occupations: Writer, school-teacher
- Writing career
- Subject: Nature writing

Walter John Campbell Murray was born in Seaford, East Sussex 20 August 1900. During the First World War he spent time at sea as a radio officer in the Mercantile Marine and later served in the R.A.F. He was a journalist in London for a short time before moving to Horam in Sussex to spend a year gathering and marketing wild herbs. Murray later became a schoolmaster, and in 1926 founded his own independent co-educational school of which he remained headmaster for forty years. Throughout his life he was a keen student of natural history, and this took him to many remote corners and islands of the United Kingdom. Murray was well known as a nature photographer, as well as a radio and television broadcaster. He died in January 1985.

== Bibliography ==
- Nature's Undiscovered Kingdom, George Allen and Unwin Ltd, 1946
- Copsford, George Allen and Unwin Ltd, 1948; Tartarus Press 2019 ISBN 9781912586110, and Little Toller Books 2019. ISBN 9781908213709
- A Sanctuary Planted, Phoenix House Ltd, 1953
- Romney Marsh, Robert Hale, 1953

with L. Hugh Newman:

- Stand and Stare, Staples Press, 1950
- Nature's Way: Questions and Answers on Animal Behaviour, Country Life, 1952
- Wander and Watch, Staples Press, 1954
