= Cowbeech =

Village in East Sussex, England

Coordinates: 50.906970°N 0.301375°E

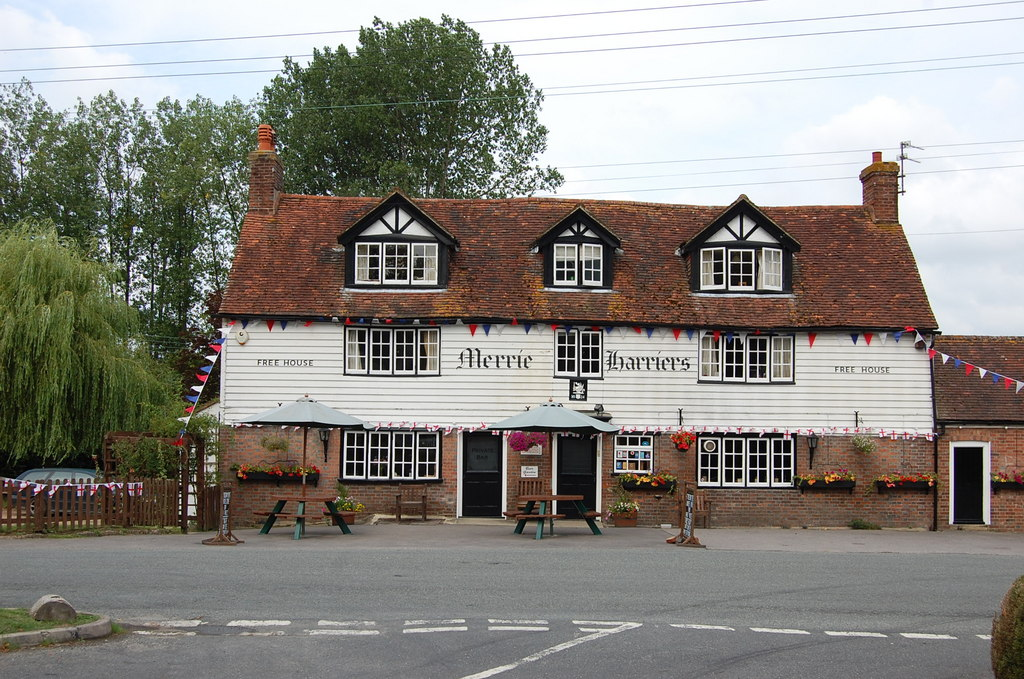
- The Merrie Harriers free house, Cowbeech

- Location within East Sussex
- Population: 280
- OS grid reference: TQ6190214466
- District: Wealden
- Shire county: East Sussex
- Region: South East
- Country: England
- Sovereign state: United Kingdom
- Post town: HAILSHAM
- Postcode district: BN27
- Dialling code: 01323
- Police: Sussex
- Fire: East Sussex
- Ambulance: South East Coast
- UK Parliament: Wealden

Cowbeech is a small village in the civil parish of Herstmonceux in the Wealden district of East Sussex, England. Its nearest town is Hailsham, which lies approximately 3.8 miles (6.1 km) south-west from the village.

== The village ==
The village has a pub with 16th Century origins, The Merrie Harriers. It is also home to the Cowbeech Bonfire Society, a Charitable Trust which organises a series of events each year to raise funds for local causes. These events include, among others, the village show (called Dig for Victory) and a pantomime in addition to the annual bonfire which gives the Society its name.

== History ==
The name Cowbeech was first recorded in 1261 as Coppetebeche, referring to a ‘capped’ or pollarded beech tree, also recorded as Kopped(e)beche in 1296 and 1316. This was then shortened over the years to Coppebeche (recorded in 1517 and 1534), Cobbeach (recorded in 1622) and then to Cobeech (recorded in 1724), before taking its contemporary form of Cowbeech.

The village was once a site of Wealden iron production. Cowbeech Forge (otherwise known as Crawle or Cralle Forge) stood alongside Hammer Lane, close to where it intersects with the Cuckmere River and produced iron between 1559 and 1693. In 1653 the forge was casting shot for the Office of Ordnance.

Before 1826, when the village pub was renamed The Merry Harriers, it was known at different times as The Old House or The Cow.

A conveyance document from 3 October 1417 transfers lands and tenements at Cowbeech in Wartling (Coppedebeche, Wortlynghe) from Thomas de Hoo, knight to Thomas Huchon of Uckfield (Ukkefeld), to Thomas Werm for the rent of a red rose at midsummer for Thomas’ life. This document makes reference to Stephen Synderford, William Stodenne, and Richard Stodenne whose family names live on in the Cowbeech area today as Cinderford Lane and Studdens Lane.

== Notable people ==
Lord Shawcross, Britain's Chief Prosecutor at the Nuremberg war crimes trials of 1945–46, lived at Cowbeech in the latter part of his life.

Elsie Bowerman, first woman barrister to appear at the Old Bailey, suffragette and RMS Titanic survivor, moved to a house at Cowbeech Hill following the death of her mother and lived there until her own death in 1973.

The Merrie Harriers inn was once owned by Sir James Duke, 1st Baronet, British Liberal Party politician who was Lord Mayor of London in 1848–1849.
