= Horam =

Village in East Sussex, England

Coordinates: 50.93°N 0.24°E

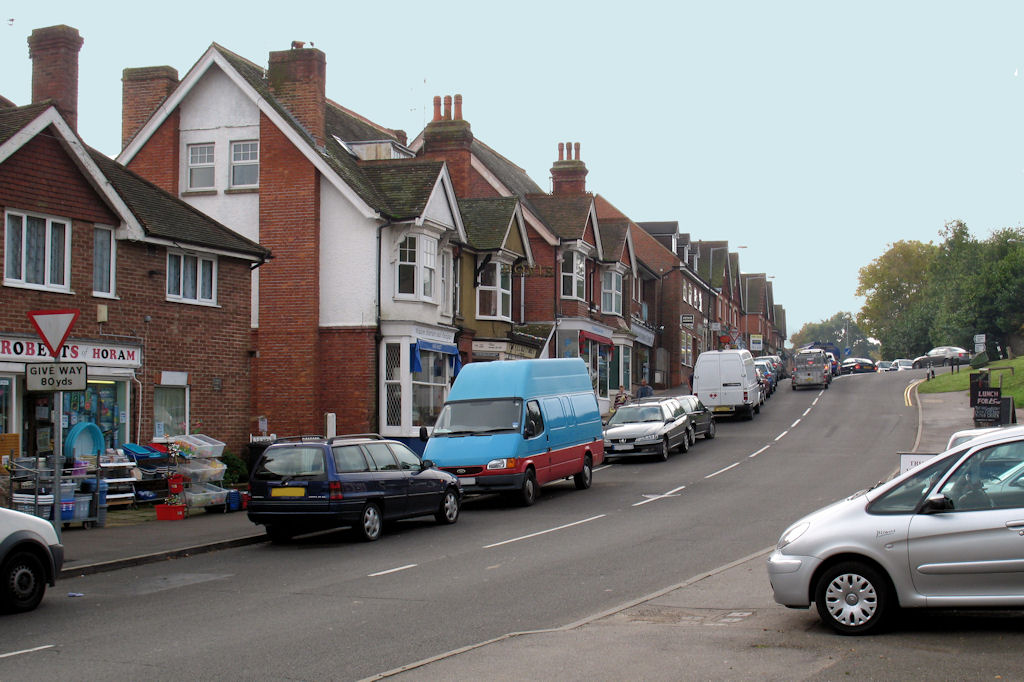
- Main thoroughfare through the village

- Location within East Sussex
- Area: 10.4 km^{2} (4.0 sq mi)
- Population: 2,642 (2011)
  - Density: 643/sq mi (248/km^{2})
- OS grid reference: TQ577174
  - London: 42 miles (68 km) NNW
- District: Wealden
- Shire county: East Sussex
- Region: South East
- Country: England
- Sovereign state: United Kingdom
- Post town: HEATHFIELD
- Postcode district: TN21
- Dialling code: 01435
- Police: Sussex
- Fire: East Sussex
- Ambulance: South East Coast
- UK Parliament: Wealden
- Website: http://www.horam.com/

Horam is a village, electoral ward and civil parish in the Wealden District of East Sussex, situated three miles (4.8 km) south of Heathfield. Included in the parish are the settlements of Vines Cross and Burlow.

== History ==
The village of Horam grew up around the railway station and was formerly known as 'Horeham' or 'Horeham Road'. The railway station (closed in 1965 under the Beeching Axe) was originally named ‘Horeham Road for Waldron’. In 1891 it became ‘Horeham Road and Waldron’. In 1925 the village changed its name to Horam, although the station persevered with ‘Waldron and Horeham Road’ until 1935. The dialling code for Horam is still listed as 'Horam Road'.

Vines Cross is named after John Vyne, who was a local vintner in 1595. Like many other settlements on the Weald, Horam was involved in the Wealden iron industry.

== Governance ==
Horam Parish Council consists of twelve members.

== Geography ==
Horam village lies on the A267 Tunbridge Wells–Eastbourne road south of Heathfield. The area is on the slopes of the Weald: there are many headwater streams of the River Cuckmere, carving out valleys, the main one being the Waldron Ghyll (or Gill).

== Transport ==
Horam is served by various routes of the Eastbourne Bus Company. The former railway line is now the Cuckoo Trail footpath through the village.

== Religion ==
The village is served by Christ Church (the local Church of England church) which is found in Horebeech Lane. The present vicar is Peter-John Guy. The small church in Vines Cross was dedicated to St James but is no longer in existence.

== Education ==
Primary education is provided at Maynards Green Primary School. St Mary's School, Horam is a secondary day and residential special school, located at Maynards Green.

== Notable locals ==
The author and naturalist Walter J.C. Murray lived in Horam and his book A Sanctuary Planted describes the cultivation of his garden on Little London Road in Horam as a private nature sanctuary. His book Copsford describes a year spent in a derelict cottage on land between Furnace Lane and Dern Lane.
