= Wealden District =

District in East Sussex, England

Coordinates: 50.999°N 0.212°E

- Non-metropolitan district
- Wealden shown within East Sussex
- Sovereign state: United Kingdom
- Constituent country: England
- Region: South East England
- Non-metropolitan county: East Sussex
- Status: Non-metropolitan district
- Admin HQ: Hailsham
- Incorporated: 1 April 1974

Government
  - Type: Non-metropolitan district council
  - Body: Wealden District Council
  - MPs: James MacCleary (LD); Nusrat Ghani (C); Kieran Mullan (C); Mims Davies (C)

Area
  - Total: 322.4 sq mi (835.0 km^{2})
  - Rank: 39th (of 296)

Population (2025)
  - Total: 168,308
  - Rank: 126th (of 296)
  - Density: 522.1/sq mi (201.6/km^{2})

Ethnicity (2021)
  - Ethnic groups: List: 96% White; 1.7% Mixed; 1.4% Asian; 0.5% other; 0.4% Black

Religion (2021)
  - Religion: List: 49.5% Christianity; 42.1% no religion; 6.3% not stated; 0.8% other; 0.5% Islam; 0.3% Buddhism; 0.2% Hinduism; 0.2% Judaism; 0.1% Sikhism
- Time zone: UTC0 (GMT)
  - Summer (DST): UTC+1 (BST)
- ONS code: 21UH (ONS); E07000065 (GSS)
- OS grid reference: TQ5519524567

Wealden is a local government district in East Sussex, England. Its council is based in Hailsham, the district's second largest town. The district also includes the towns of Crowborough, Polegate and Uckfield, along with numerous villages and surrounding rural areas. The district's name comes from the Weald, the landscape and ancient woodland which occupies much of the centre and north of the area.

Much of the district's landscape is recognised for its beauty; the south of the district includes part of the South Downs National Park, and the north of the district includes part of the High Weald Area of Outstanding Natural Beauty. The district has two sections of coastline, lying east and west of the neighbouring authority of Eastbourne, with the western section of coastline including the cliffs known as the Seven Sisters.

The neighbouring districts are Eastbourne, Lewes, Mid Sussex, Tandridge, Sevenoaks, Tunbridge Wells and Rother.

== History ==
The district was formed on 1 April 1974 under the Local Government Act 1972. It covered the area of two former districts, which were both abolished at the same time:

- Hailsham Rural District
- Uckfield Rural District

The new district was named Wealden after the landscape and woodland.

Local government reorganisation is being considered for the area. In July 2026, the government announced reforms across East Sussex which included abolishing Wealden district and creating an East Sussex unitary authority covering most of the county council's current area. In September 2026 these proposals were paused for further review.

== Governance ==
Wealden District Council

Type
- Type: Non-metropolitan district

History
- Founded: 1 April 1974

Leadership
- Chair: Gavin Blake-Coggins, Liberal Democrat since 14 May 2025
- Leader: Rachel Millward, Green Party since 14 May 2026
- Deputy Leader: James Partridge, Liberal Democrats since 14 May 2026
- Chief Executive: Trevor Scott since 19 July 2018

Structure
- Seats: 45 councillors
- Political groups: Administration (23) Liberal Democrats (12) Green (10) Independent in administration (1) Other parties (22) Conservative (9) Reform (2) Labour (2) Independent (9)

Elections
- Voting system: First past the post
- Last election: 4 May 2023
- Next election: 6 May 2027

Meeting place
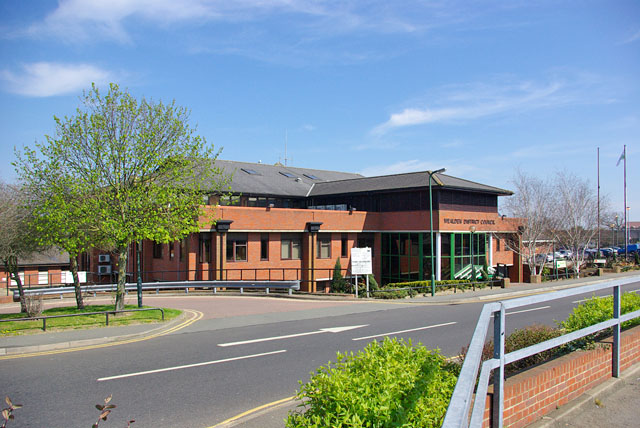
- Council Offices, Vicarage Lane, Hailsham, BN27 2AX

Website
- www.wealden.gov.uk

Wealden District Council provides district-level services. County-level services are provided by East Sussex County Council. The whole district is also covered by civil parishes, which form a third tier of local government.

In the parts of the district within the South Downs National Park, town planning is the responsibility of the South Downs National Park Authority. The district council appoints one of its councillors to serve on the 27-person National Park Authority.

=== Political control ===
The council has been under no overall control since the 2023 election, being led by a coalition of the Liberal Democrats and Greens. The two Labour councillors subsequently joined the coalition in November 2024. An Independent councillor subsequently joined that coalition. The two Labour members left the coalition in November 2026 under direction from their national party.

The first election to the council was held in 1973, initially operating as a shadow authority alongside the outgoing authorities until the new arrangements took effect on 1 April 1974. Political control of the council since 1974 has been as follows:

Party in control	Years
Conservative	1974–1995
No overall control	1995–1997
Conservative	1997–2023
No overall control	2023–present

=== Leadership ===
The leaders of the council since 1999 have been:

Councillor	Party	From	To
Rupert Thornely-Taylor	Conservative	1999	May 2003
Nigel Coltman	Conservative	21 May 2003	May 2007
Pam Doodes	Conservative	23 May 2007	May 2010
Bob Standley	Conservative	19 May 2010	May 2022
Ann Newton	Conservative	18 May 2022	May 2023
James Partridge	Liberal Democrats	24 May 2023	15 May 2024
Rachel Millward	Green	15 May 2024	14 May 2025
James Partridge	Liberal Democrats	14 May 2025	14 May 2026
Rachel Millward	Green	14 May 2026	

=== Composition ===
Following the 2023 election and subsequent changes of allegiance up to May 2026, the composition of the council was:

Party	Councillor
Liberal Democrats	12
Green	10
Labour	2
Conservative	9
Reform	2
Independent	10
Total	45

The Liberal Democrats, Greens, and a single Independent together as the "Alliance for Wealden" group, which forms the council's administration. Of the other independent councillors, five sit as the "Independent Group", four form the "Independent Democrats". The next election is due in 2027.

=== Premises ===
The council is based at the Council Offices on Vicarage Lane in Hailsham. The building was purpose-built for the council and opened in 1982.

When created in 1974 the council inherited two main offices from its predecessors:

- Cortlandt, 18 George Street, Hailsham, an eighteenth century house which had been bought by Hailsham Rural District Council in 1932.
- Starfield, Beacon Road, Crowborough, formerly the home and observatory of astronomer Isaac Roberts, which had been bought by Uckfield Rural District Council in 1928.

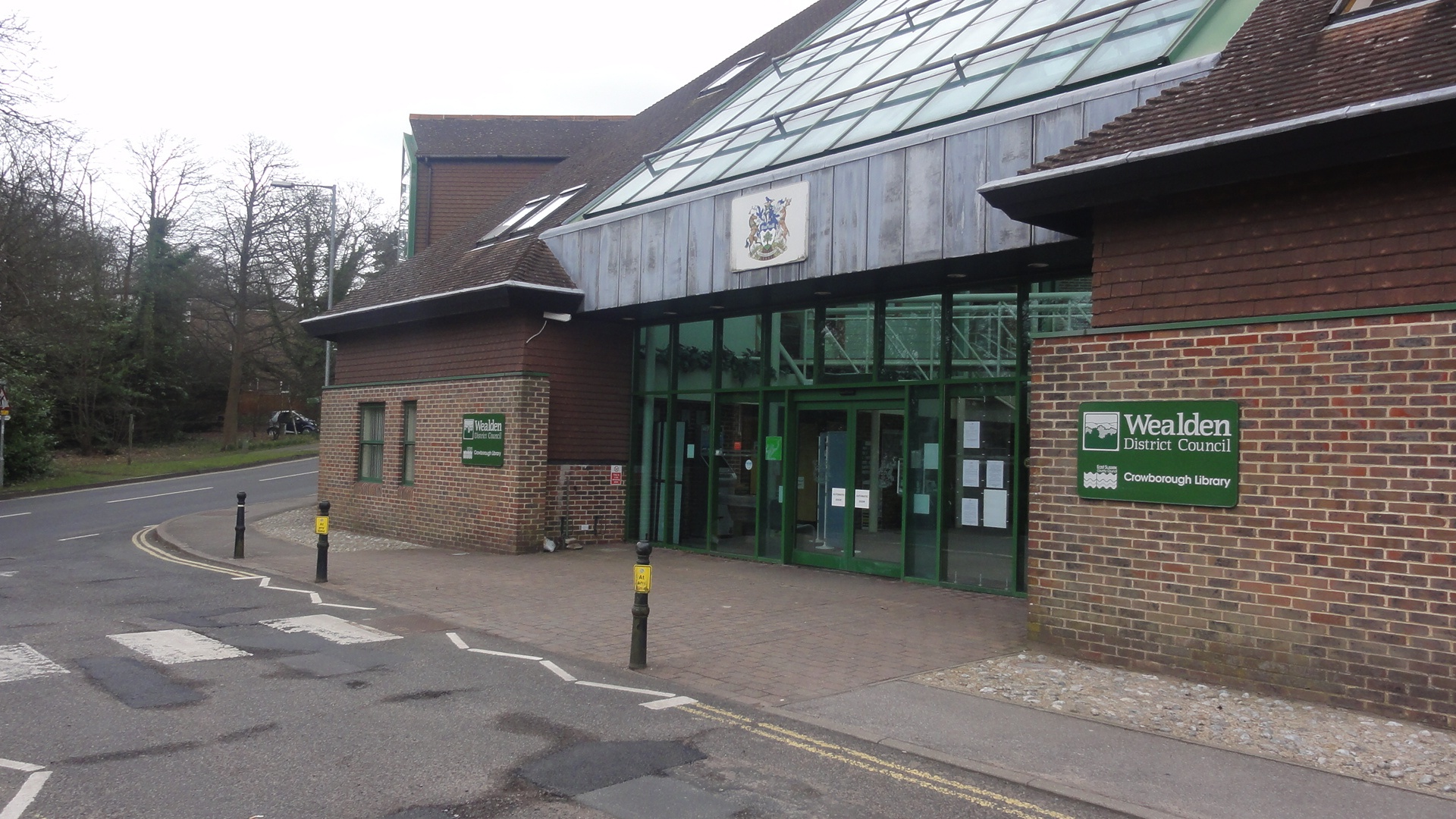
Council's former Crowborough office at Pine Grove, built 1988.

The council's staff were initially divided between the two buildings. The council moved its Hailsham office from Cortlandt to the new Council Offices on Vicarage Lane in 1982. The Crowborough office moved to a new building on Pine Grove in 1988, with Starfield subsequently being redeveloped for housing.

The council subsequently consolidated its offices at the Hailsham building and sold the Crowborough building to Crowborough Town Council in 2016.

=== Elections ===
Since the last boundary changes in 2019 the council has comprised 45 councillors representing 41 wards, with each ward electing one or two councillors. Elections are held every four years.

Ward	Population (2021 Census)
Arlington	2,963
Buxted	3,892
Chiddingly, East Hoathly and Waldron	3,309
Crowborough Central	4,125
Crowborough Jarvis Brook	4,305
Crowborough North	3,286
Crowborough South East	3,804
Crowborough South West	3,237
Crowborough St. Johns	2,935
Danehill & Fletching	3,886
Forest Row	4,135
Framfield & Cross-in-Hand	3,243
Frant & Wadhurst (2 seats)	6,941
Hadlow Down & Rotherfield	3,257
Hailsham Central	3,545
Hailsham East	4,785
Hailsham East	4,785
Hailsham North	2,914
Hailsham North West	3,738
Hailsham South	3,327
Hailsham West	4,232
Hartfield	3,284
Heathfield North	3,913
Heathfield South	4,163
Hellingly	5,011
Herstmonceux & Pevensey Levels (2 seats)	6,931
Horam & Punnetts Town (2 seats)	6,902
Lower Willingdon	3,314
Maresfield	3,659
Mayfield & Five Ashes	3,654
Pevensey Bay	2,890
Polegate Central	5,107
Polegate North	3,868
Polegate South & Willingdon Watermill	3,450
South Downs	2,977
Stone Cross	3,685
Uckfield East	3,225
Uckfield New Town (2 seats)	5,744
Uckfield North	3,131
Uckfield Ridgewood & Little Horsted	3,152
Upper Willingdon	3,266
Withyham	2,956
Total Wealden	160,151

== Geography ==
Wealden District covers two main upland areas: the section of the High Weald within East Sussex; and the eastern end of the South Downs, between which lies the Vale of Sussex, the lowlands of which are named the Pevensey Levels. The River Ouse, some of the tributaries of which originate in the district, is the border with the Lewes District; and the River Cuckmere is wholly in Wealden. The district's coastline to the English Channel to the south is interrupted by Eastbourne. The River Rother rises on the Weald and flows easterly to the east of Rye Bay.

The Wealden basin contains significant reserves of shale oil, totalling 4.4 billion barrels of oil in Wealden and surrounding areas according to a 2014 study, which then Business and Energy Minister Michael Fallon said "will bring jobs and business opportunities" and significantly help with UK energy self-sufficiency. Fracking in the area has been opposed by environmental groups, due to concerns over sustainability, safety and economic viability.

At the 2011 census the district had the highest proportion of home ownership of the 37 local authorities in Surrey, Sussex and Kent.

=== Towns and parishes ===
This district is entirely divided into civil parishes. The parish councils for Crowborough, Hailsham, Polegate and Uckfield take the style "town council". Some of the smaller parishes have a parish meeting rather than a parish council.

Parish	Type	Area (sq mi)	Population (2007)	Pop. density (/sq mi)
Alciston	Parish Meeting	2.7	146	53.7
Alfriston	Parish Council	3.6	774	214.2
Arlington	Parish Council	7.1	490	69.2
Berwick	Parish Council	1.9	289	149.4
Buxted	Parish Council	8.4	3145	376.4
Chalvington with Ripe	Parish Council	4.3	1082	252.0
Chiddingly	Parish Council	6.8	1006	147.9
Crowborough	Town Council	5.2	19988	3812.1
Cuckmere Valley	Parish Council	6.8	197	28.9
Danehill	Parish Council	8.7	1927	220.3
East Dean and Friston	Parish Council	3.3	1577	474.9
East Hoathly with Halland	Parish Council	5.8	1343	229.9
Fletching	Parish Council	9.9	1041	104.7
Forest Row	Parish Council	12.6	5054	402.4
Framfield	Parish Council	7.6	1855	243.3
Frant	Parish Council	12.3	1367	110.9
Hadlow Down	Parish Council	6.6	715	109.1
Hailsham	Town Council	7.5	19836	2652.3
Hartfield	Parish Council	16.2	2157	132.9
Heathfield and Waldron	Parish Council	20.4	11514	564.5
Hellingly	Parish Council	7.6	1552	205.1
Herstmonceux	Parish Council	9.5	2598	272.8
Hooe	Parish Council	3.9	446	115.4
Horam	Parish Council	4.0	2583	643.3
Isfield	Parish Council	3.0	564	190.7
Laughton	Parish Council	7.3	585	79.7
Little Horsted	Parish Meeting	4.1	168	40.8
Long Man	Parish Council	6.2	412	66.2
Maresfield	Parish Council	10.1	3246	319.9
Mayfield and Five Ashes	Parish Council	16.4	3562	217.6
Ninfield	Parish Council	4.1	1520	371.7
Pevensey	Parish Council	6.8	3152	463.8
Polegate	Town Council	2.8	8021	2853.6
Rotherfield	Parish Council	17.8	3151	177.0
Selmeston	Parish Meeting	2.6	190	73.1
Uckfield	Town Council	2.9	13873	4810.0
Wadhurst	Parish Council	15.5	4818	311.0
Warbleton	Parish Council	11.2	1262	112.3
Wartling	Parish Council	4.3	396	92.7
Westham	Parish Council	5.5	5829	1066.9
Willingdon and Jevington	Parish Council	4.1	6156	1511.3
Withyham	Parish Council	14.2	2651	186.7
Total Wealden		321.7	142238	442.2

== Transport ==
The major trunk road is the A22, London to Eastbourne; it is crossed by the A26 Maidstone–Newhaven road at Uckfield; and the A267 Tunbridge Wells to Eastbourne road. There are also three west–east roads: the A259 coastal route; next inland is the A27 Pevensey–Brighton trunk road; and further to the north the A272 cross-country route to Winchester.

The East Coastway Line, serving Eastbourne and Hastings, uses the Vale of Sussex and has two station serving different sides of Pevensey in the district, which forms a generally suburban conurbation with Westham and a largely rural holiday and visitor coastline, Pevensey Bay. The other railway line is the Oxted Line from London Bridge.

Bus service is provided by Wealdlink.

Wealden is crossed by a number of National Cycle Network routes:

Route 2 (South Coast Cycle Route)

Route 21 (London to Eastbourne) which makes use of the Forest Way and Cuckoo Trail paths along disused railway lines

Long-distance footpaths include the South Downs Way, the Monarch's Way, the Sussex Border Path and the Wealdway.

== Media ==
Wealden is served by BBC South East and ITV Meridian broadcasting from the Heathfield TV transmitter which is situated near Heathfield.

Radio stations for the area are:

- BBC Radio Sussex
- Heart South
- Ashdown Radio (serving Uckfield and Crowborough)
- Seahaven FM (covering Polegate)
- More Radio Eastbourne (covering Hailsham)

== Landmarks ==
Major landmarks include the Seven Sisters and Cuckmere Haven along the coast; and the Long Man of Wilmington together with all of the paths over the South Downs National Park. Roman fortified hills can be found in the north of the area and Uckfield has a large architectural conservation area.

Sheffield Park Garden is an informal landscape garden now owned by the National Trust but laid out by Capability Brown. Near to this is the terminus of the Bluebell Railway, a heritage, steam railway line.

A late medieval castle construction, moated Herstmonceux Castle, was begun in 1440. It is open to visitors and there are organised tours on a few summer days.

The north of the district includes Ashdown Forest, which provided the inspiration for the Hundred Acre Wood in the Winnie the Pooh stories by A. A. Milne, who lived in Hartfield.

== See also ==
- List of current places of worship in Wealden
- List of former places of worship in Wealden
