= Grade I listed buildings in East Sussex =

East Sussex shown in England

There are over 9300 Grade I listed buildings in England. This page is a list of these buildings in the county of East Sussex.

== Eastbourne ==
| Name | Location | Type | Completed (Note: The date given is the date used by Historic England as significant for the initial building or that of an important part in the structure's description.) | Date designated | Grid ref. (Note: Sometimes known as OSGB36, the grid reference is based on the British national grid reference system used by the Ordnance Survey.) Geo-coordinates | Entry number (Note: The "List Entry Number" is a unique number assigned to each listed building and scheduled monument by Historic England.) | Image |
|---|---|---|---|---|---|---|---|
| Church of St Mary | Old Town, Eastbourne | Bell Tower | Early 14th century | 27 May 1949 | TV5986399460; 50°46′22″N 0°15′57″E | 1293915 | Church of St Mary More images |
| Compton Place | Eastbourne | House | 1726 | 27 May 1949 | TV6029498582; 50°45′53″N 0°16′18″E | 1353113 | Compton Place More images |
| The Stables and Coachhouses at Compton Place | Eastbourne | Courtyard | 18th century | 27 May 1949 | TV6035998606; 50°45′54″N 0°16′21″E | 1190359 | The Stables and Coachhouses at Compton Place More images |

== Hastings ==
| Name | Location | Type | Completed | Date designated | Grid ref. Geo-coordinates | Entry number | Image |
|---|---|---|---|---|---|---|---|
| Hastings Castle | Hastings | Castle | c. 1070 | 19 January 1951 | TQ8202709482; 50°51′22″N 0°35′05″E | 1043579 | Hastings Castle More images |

== Lewes ==
| Name | Location | Type | Completed | Date designated | Grid ref. Geo-coordinates | Entry number | Image |
|---|---|---|---|---|---|---|---|
| Church of St Andrew | Beddingham, Lewes | Church | Norman | 20 August 1965 | TQ4450107897; 50°51′09″N 0°03′05″E | 1276141 | Church of St Andrew More images |
| Wings Place (Anne of Cleves House) | Ditchling, Lewes | Timber Framed House | Late 16th century | 17 March 1952 | TQ3249915208; 50°55′16″N 0°06′59″W | 1043969 | Wings Place (Anne of Cleves House) More images |
| Church of St Margaret | Ditchling, Lewes | Church | Pre Conquest | 20 August 1965 | TQ3253915237; 50°55′17″N 0°06′57″W | 1352964 | Church of St Margaret More images |
| Firle Place | Firle, Lewes | Country House | Late 15th century | 17 March 1952 | TQ4734507131; 50°50′42″N 0°05′30″E | 1217315 | Firle Place More images |
| Church of St Peter | Firle, Lewes | Church | 13th century | 20 August 1965 | TQ4712207128; 50°50′42″N 0°05′18″E | 1043939 | Church of St Peter More images |
| Glynde Place | Glynde, Lewes | Country House | 16th century | 17 March 1952 | TQ4565009356; 50°51′55″N 0°04′06″E | 1221546 | Glynde Place More images |
| Glynde Place Stables | Glynde, Lewes | Wall | Between 1755 and 1760 | 17 March 1952 | TQ4562809296; 50°51′53″N 0°04′05″E | 1221605 | Glynde Place Stables More images |
| Shelley's Folly | Cooksbridge, Hamsey, Lewes | House | Late 17th century | 17 March 1952 | TQ4033615008; 50°55′03″N 0°00′18″W | 1221876 | Shelley's Folly More images |
| Church of St Peter | Hamsey, Lewes | Church | Early 12th century | 20 August 1965 | TQ4143212116; 50°53′28″N 0°00′34″E | 1222114 | Church of St Peter More images |
| Swanborough Manor and the Dovecote to North West of the House | Iford, Lewes | House | 18th century | 17 March 1952 | TQ4009407806; 50°51′10″N 0°00′40″W | 1274722 | Swanborough Manor and the Dovecote to North West of the House More images |
| Church of St Nicholas | Iford, Lewes | Church | Early 12th century | 20 August 1965 | TQ4083407333; 50°50′54″N 0°00′03″W | 1222119 | Church of St Nicholas More images |
| St Anne's Church | Lewes | Church | Early 12th century | 25 February 1952 | TQ4093510005; 50°52′21″N 0°00′06″E | 1043687 | St Anne's Church More images |
| Church of St John the Baptist | Southover, Lewes | Church | Late 11th century or early 12th century | 25 February 1952 | TQ4126309649; 50°52′09″N 0°00′22″E | 1353095 | Church of St John the Baptist More images |
| Church of St Michael and Railings | Lewes | Gate | 13th century | 25 February 1952 | TQ4132210002; 50°52′20″N 0°00′26″E | 1287005 | Church of St Michael and Railings More images |
| Jireh Chapel and Sunday School to North | Cliffe, Lewes | Sunday School | 1874 | 25 February 1952 | TQ4211910381; 50°52′32″N 0°01′07″E | 1192055 | Jireh Chapel and Sunday School to North More images |
| Keep to Lewes Castle | Lewes | Castle | c. 1100 | 25 February 1952 | TQ4132710068; 50°52′22″N 0°00′26″E | 1043894 | Keep to Lewes Castle More images |
| Barbican to Lewes Castle and Walls to South | Lewes | Wall | Early 14th century | 25 February 1952 | TQ4140210071; 50°52′22″N 0°00′30″E | 1043895 | Barbican to Lewes Castle and Walls to South More images |
| Remains of Inner Gatehouse and Walls to East and West, Lewes castle | Lewes | Wall | 12th century | 16 March 1970 | TQ4140610084; 50°52′23″N 0°00′30″E | 1293875 | Remains of Inner Gatehouse and Walls to East and West, Lewes castle More images |
| Malling House | Malling, Lewes | Country House | Mid 17th century | 25 February 1952 | TQ4164611125; 50°52′56″N 0°00′44″E | 1043904 | Malling House More images |
| Ruins of Lewes Priory | Lewes | Country House | 1537-1540 | 25 February 1952 | TQ4142909558; 50°52′06″N 0°00′31″E | 1190737 | Ruins of Lewes Priory More images |
| Church of St John | Piddinghoe, Lewes | Church | Early 13th century | 20 August 1965 | TQ4351003080; 50°48′34″N 0°02′08″E | 1238098 | Church of St John More images |
| Church of St Michael and All Angels | Plumpton, Lewes | Anglican Church | c. 1200 | 20 August 1965 | TQ3567813503; 50°54′18″N 0°04′18″W | 1238266 | Church of St Michael and All Angels More images |
| Church of St Mary the Virgin | Ringmer, Lewes | Church | Medieval | 20 August 1965 | TQ4457812509; 50°53′38″N 0°03′16″E | 1238690 | Church of St Mary the Virgin More images |
| Church of St Peter | Rodmell, Lewes | Church | Early 12th century | 20 August 1965 | TQ4216806267; 50°50′19″N 0°01′04″E | 1238975 | Church of St Peter More images |
| Church of St Andrew | Bishopstone, Lewes | Church | Saxon | 2 March 1950 | TQ4724500979; 50°47′23″N 0°05′16″E | 1044059 | Church of St Andrew More images |
| Church of St Leonard | Seaford, Lewes | Parish Church | Early 12th century | 2 March 1950 | TV4826299028; 50°46′19″N 0°06′05″E | 1352955 | Church of St Leonard More images |
| Southease Parish Church | Southease, Lewes | Church | 11th century | 20 August 1965 | TQ4230205271; 50°49′46″N 0°01′09″E | 1239384 | Southease Parish Church More images |
| Church of St Mary | Tarring Neville, Lewes | Church | Transitional Norman | 20 August 1965 | TQ4440803785; 50°48′56″N 0°02′55″E | 1222661 | Church of St Mary More images |
| Church of St Lawrence | Telscombe, Lewes | Church | 12th century | 20 August 1965 | TQ4054803365; 50°48′46″N 0°00′23″W | 1222720 | Church of St Lawrence More images |
| Great Ote Hall | Wivelsfield, Lewes | House | Modern | 17 March 1952 | TQ3312120282; 50°58′00″N 0°06′20″W | 1223018 | Great Ote Hall More images |

== Rother ==
| Name | Location | Type | Completed | Date designated | Grid ref. Geo-coordinates | Entry number | Image |
|---|---|---|---|---|---|---|---|
| Church of St Peter | Ashburnham, Rother | Parish Church | 15th century | 3 August 1961 | TQ6895114549; 50°54′20″N 0°24′06″E | 1044264 | Church of St Peter More images |
| Battle Abbey Ruins | Battle, Rother | Abbey | 1087 | 3 August 1961 | TQ7500715726; 50°54′52″N 0°29′18″E | 1352861 | Battle Abbey Ruins More images |
| Battle Abbey School | Battle, Rother | Abbey | Medieval | 3 August 1961 | TQ7490115694; 50°54′51″N 0°29′12″E | 1044211 | Battle Abbey School More images |
| Battle Abbey Gatehouse | Battle, Rother | Porters Lodge | 12th century | 3 August 1961 | TQ7484915786; 50°54′54″N 0°29′10″E | 1278698 | Battle Abbey Gatehouse More images |
| Church of St Mary | Battle, Rother | Parish Church | Medieval | 3 August 1961 | TQ7502615798; 50°54′54″N 0°29′19″E | 1231477 | Church of St Mary More images |
| Battle Abbey Precinct Wall | Battle, Rother | Wall | 14th century | 13 May 1987 | TQ7497815772; 50°54′54″N 0°29′16″E | 1044144 | Battle Abbey Precinct Wall More images |
| Church of All Saints | Beckley, Rother | Parish Church | c. 1100 | 3 August 1961 | TQ8427223728; 50°59′00″N 0°37′26″E | 1044150 | Church of All Saints More images |
| Bodiam Castle | Bodiam, Rother | Castle | Post 1385 | 3 August 1961 | TQ7855425645; 51°00′09″N 0°32′36″E | 1044134 | Bodiam Castle More images |
| Church of St George | Brede, Rother | Parish Church | 13th century | 3 August 1961 | TQ8253018265; 50°56′06″N 0°35′47″E | 1232070 | Church of St George More images |
| Church of St Thomas a Becket | Brightling, Rother | Parish Church | 13th century | 3 August 1961 | TQ6835421004; 50°57′50″N 0°23′46″E | 1352914 | Church of St Thomas a Becket More images |
| Bateman's | Bateman's, Burwash, Rother | House | 1634 | 3 August 1961 | TQ6708423799; 50°59′22″N 0°22′45″E | 1044063 | Bateman's More images |
| Church of St George | Crowhurst, Rother | Parish Church | 15th century | 3 August 1961 | TQ7573312339; 50°53′02″N 0°29′49″E | 1233292 | Church of St George More images |
| Haremere Hall | Etchingham, Rother | House | Early 17th century | 3 August 1961 | TQ7223426580; 51°00′46″N 0°27′14″E | 1233611 | Haremere Hall More images |
| Church of St Nicholas and St Mary | Etchingham, Rother | Parish Church | 1366-9 | 3 August 1961 | TQ7136126200; 51°00′35″N 0°26′29″E | 1276456 | Church of St Nicholas and St Mary More images |
| Church of St James | Ewhurst Green, Ewhurst, Rother | Parish Church | Medieval | 3 August 1961 | TQ7955824568; 50°59′33″N 0°33′26″E | 1233841 | Church of St James More images |
| Church of St Laurence | Guestling Green, Guestling, Rother | Parish Church | Norman | 3 August 1961 | TQ8555714467; 50°54′00″N 0°38′15″E | 1233969 | Church of St Laurence More images |
| Camber Castle | Winchelsea, Icklesham, Rother | Castle | 1538 | 3 August 1961 | TQ9218618457; 50°56′01″N 0°44′01″E | 1234738 | Camber Castle More images |
| Land Gate, the Pipewell | Winchelsea, Icklesham, Rother | Town Gate | Pre 15th century | 3 August 1961 | TQ9037417641; 50°55′37″N 0°42′27″E | 1234567 | Land Gate, the Pipewell More images |
| The Court Hall Town Museum | Winchelsea, Icklesham, Rother | Town Hall | 1557 | 3 August 1961 | TQ9045117424; 50°55′29″N 0°42′31″E | 1234513 | The Court Hall Town Museum More images |
| The New Gate | Winchelsea, Icklesham, Rother | Town Gate | Medieval | 3 August 1961 | TQ9010116438; 50°54′58″N 0°42′11″E | 1234744 | The New Gate More images |
| Church of All Saints (previously St Nicholas) | Icklesham, Rother | Parish Church | Norman | 3 August 1961 | TQ8804916474; 50°55′02″N 0°40′26″E | 1276241 | Church of All Saints (previously St Nicholas) More images |
| Church of St Thomas the Martyr | Winchelsea, Icklesham, Rother | Parish Church | Decorated | 13 May 1987 | TQ9049917355; 50°55′27″N 0°42′33″E | 1276072 | Church of St Thomas the Martyr More images |
| The Ruins of the Church of Grey Friars Monastery in the Grounds of Grey Friars | Winchelsea, Icklesham, Rother | Church | c1310-20 | 3 August 1961 | TQ9060417099; 50°55′19″N 0°42′38″E | 1234450 | The Ruins of the Church of Grey Friars Monastery in the Grounds of Grey Friars More images |
| The Strand Gate | Winchelsea, Icklesham, Rother | Town Gate | Medieval | 3 August 1961 | TQ9068317406; 50°55′29″N 0°42′43″E | 1234546 | The Strand Gate More images |
| Church of All Saints | Iden, Rother | Parish Church | Older-Pre 14th century | 3 August 1961 | TQ9154923752; 50°58′53″N 0°43′39″E | 1275899 | Church of All Saints More images |
| Brickwall | Northiam, Rother | House | Early 17th century | 3 August 1961 | TQ8305724048; 50°59′12″N 0°36′24″E | 1217202 | Brickwall More images |
| Great Dixter | Northiam, Rother | House | 1912 | 3 August 1961 | TQ8196825105; 50°59′48″N 0°35′30″E | 1216957 | Great Dixter More images |
| Church of St Peter and St Paul | Peasmarsh, Rother | Parish Church | Norman | 3 August 1961 | TQ8871821842; 50°57′54″N 0°41′10″E | 1217124 | Church of St Peter and St Paul More images |
| Church of St Michael | Penhurst, Rother | Parish Church | 14th century | 3 August 1961 | TQ6943016556; 50°55′25″N 0°24′34″E | 1217346 | Church of St Michael More images |
| Church of St Michael | Playden, Rother | Parish Church | c. 1200 | 3 August 1961 | TQ9202021676; 50°57′45″N 0°43′59″E | 1217674 | Church of St Michael More images |
| Church of St Mary | Rye, Rother | Parish Church | 1150-80 | 12 October 1951 | TQ9215020302; 50°57′00″N 0°44′03″E | 1190669 | Church of St Mary More images |
| Rye Working Men's Conservative Club | Rye, Rother | School | 1636 | 12 October 1951 | TQ9210220422; 50°57′04″N 0°44′01″E | 1251550 | Rye Working Men's Conservative Club More images |
| The Landgate | Rye, Rother | Gate | 1340 | 12 October 1951 | TQ9221320608; 50°57′10″N 0°44′07″E | 1251769 | The Landgate More images |
| The Ypres Tower | Rye, Rother | Tower | 1250 approximately | 12 October 1951 | TQ9224720269; 50°56′59″N 0°44′08″E | 1251521 | The Ypres Tower More images |
| Robertsbridge Abbey | Robertsbridge, Rother | Abbey | c. 1200 | 3 August 1961 | TQ7542823845; 50°59′14″N 0°29′53″E | 1221354 | Robertsbridge Abbey More images |
| Church of St Mary | Salehurst, Rother | Parish Church | 13th century | 3 August 1961 | TQ7493524244; 50°59′28″N 0°29′29″E | 1221247 | Church of St Mary More images |
| Manor Cottages | Sedlescombe, Rother | House | 16th century | 3 August 1961 | TQ7806018042; 50°56′04″N 0°31′58″E | 1274791 | Manor Cottages More images |
| Pashley Manor | Ticehurst, Rother | House | Early 18th century | 3 August 1961 | TQ7062029060; 51°02′08″N 0°25′56″E | 1222449 | Pashley Manor More images |
| Church of St Mary | Udimore, Rother | Parish Church | Norman | 3 August 1961 | TQ8633718958; 50°56′24″N 0°39′03″E | 1274500 | Church of St Mary More images |
| Church of St John the Baptist | Westfield, Rother | Parish Church | Norman | 3 August 1961 | TQ8098615211; 50°54′29″N 0°34′22″E | 1238182 | Church of St John the Baptist More images |
| De La Warr Pavilion | Bexhill on Sea, Rother | Pavilion | 1936 | 28 January 1971 | TQ7411407134; 50°50′15″N 0°28′17″E | 1352840 | De La Warr Pavilion More images |

== The City of Brighton and Hove ==
| Name | Location | Type | Completed | Date designated | Grid ref. Geo-coordinates | Entry number | Image |
|---|---|---|---|---|---|---|---|
| Arundel House | The City of Brighton and Hove | Guest House | 1950- | 13 October 1952 | TQ3331903426; 50°48′54″N 0°06′32″W | 1379917 | Arundel House More images |
| Church of All Saints | The City of Brighton and Hove | Church | 1889-91 | 24 March 1950 | TQ2918005020; 50°49′49″N 0°10′01″W | 1187592 | Church of All Saints More images |
| Church of St Andrew including Walls, Railings and Gates | The City of Brighton and Hove | Gate | 1827-8 | 24 March 1950 | TQ2992104282; 50°49′25″N 0°09′25″W | 1298653 | Church of St Andrew including Walls, Railings and Gates More images |
| Church of St Bartholomew | The City of Brighton and Hove | Anglican Church | 1872-1874 | 13 October 1952 | TQ3128905135; 50°49′51″N 0°08′14″W | 1379913 | Church of St Bartholomew More images |
| Church of St Michael and All Angels and Attached Walls | The City of Brighton and Hove | Wall | Designed 1858 | 20 August 1971 | TQ3040204734; 50°49′39″N 0°08′59″W | 1381083 | Church of St Michael and All Angels and Attached Walls More images |
| Church of St Wulfran | Ovingdean, The City of Brighton and Hove | Tower | Late 13th century | 13 October 1952 | TQ3553903559; 50°48′57″N 0°04′39″W | 1380550 | Church of St Wulfran More images |
| Falmer House Including Moat Within Courtyard | The City of Brighton and Hove | Moat | 1960-1962 | 30 August 1993 | TQ3459008940; 50°51′52″N 0°05′20″W | 1381044 | Falmer House Including Moat Within Courtyard More images |
| Marlborough House and Attached Railings | The City of Brighton and Hove | House | 1765 | 13 October 1952 | TQ3120904031; 50°49′15″N 0°08′19″W | 1380671 | Marlborough House and Attached Railings More images |
| Nos 1-29 Brunswick Square and attached railings | The City of Brighton and Hove | Terrace | 1825-27 | 24 March 1950 | TQ2981104365; 50°49′27″N 0°09′30″W | 1187544 | Nos 1-29 Brunswick Square and attached railings More images |
| Nos 1-6, Brunswick Terrace and attached railings | The City of Brighton and Hove | Apartment | 1950 | 24 March 1950 | TQ2991504232; 50°49′23″N 0°09′25″W | 1204829 | Nos 1-6, Brunswick Terrace and attached railings More images |
| Nos 7-19, Brunswick Terrace and attached railings | The City of Brighton and Hove | Apartment | 1992 | 24 March 1950 | TQ2983304249; 50°49′24″N 0°09′29″W | 1281033 | Nos 7-19, Brunswick Terrace and attached railings More images |
| Nos 20-32, Brunswick Terrace and attached railings | The City of Brighton and Hove | Apartment | By 1992 | 24 March 1950 | TQ2964804288; 50°49′25″N 0°09′38″W | 1187546 | Nos 20-32, Brunswick Terrace and attached railings More images |
| Nos 33-42, Brunswick Terrace and attached railings | The City of Brighton and Hove | Apartment | 1950 | 24 March 1950 | TQ2953904306; 50°49′26″N 0°09′44″W | 1204856 | Nos 33-42, Brunswick Terrace and attached railings More images |
| Nos 30-58, 30a and 33a (consecutive), Brunswick Square and attached railings | The City of Brighton and Hove | Terrace | 1825-27 | 24 March 1950 | TQ2976304485; 50°49′31″N 0°09′32″W | 1281017 | Nos 30-58, 30a and 33a (consecutive), Brunswick Square and attached railings More images |
| Nos 1-14, Lewes Crescent and attached Railings | The City of Brighton and Hove | Terrace | 1823-1828 | 13 October 1952 | TQ3306703559; 50°48′59″N 0°06′45″W | 1381658 | Nos 1-14, Lewes Crescent and attached Railings More images |
| Numbers 15-28, Lewes Crescent and attached Railings | The City of Brighton and Hove | Apartment | 1952 | 13 October 1952 | TQ3325603501; 50°48′57″N 0°06′35″W | 1381659 | Numbers 15-28, Lewes Crescent and attached Railings More images |
| Numbers 1-14, Chichester Terrace and Chichester House and attached Railings | The City of Brighton and Hove | Terrace | 1824-1855 | 13 October 1952 | TQ3297003541; 50°48′58″N 0°06′50″W | 1380256 | Numbers 1-14, Chichester Terrace and Chichester House and attached Railings More images |
| Numbers 1-10, Sussex Square and attached Piers and Railings | The City of Brighton and Hove | Terrace | 1825-1827 | 13 October 1952 | TQ3313503621; 50°49′01″N 0°06′41″W | 1380969 | Numbers 1-10, Sussex Square and attached Piers and Railings More images |
| Numbers 11-40, Sussex Square and attached Railings | The City of Brighton and Hove | Apartment | 1999 | 13 October 1952 | TQ3322503728; 50°49′04″N 0°06′36″W | 1380970 | Numbers 11-40, Sussex Square and attached Railings More images |
| Numbers 41-50, Sussex Square and attached Railings | The City of Brighton and Hove | Apartment | 1999 | 13 October 1952 | TQ3324103587; 50°48′59″N 0°06′36″W | 1380971 | Numbers 41-50, Sussex Square and attached Railings More images |
| Stanmer House | Stanmer Park, The City of Brighton and Hove | House | Pre 1722 | 2 November 1954 | TQ3364509466; 50°52′09″N 0°06′08″W | 1380958 | Stanmer House More images |
| The Corn Exchange and Dome Theatre | The City of Brighton and Hove | Corn Exchange | 1868 | 13 October 1952 | TQ3122404297; 50°49′24″N 0°08′18″W | 1380398 | The Corn Exchange and Dome Theatre More images |
| The Royal Pavilion | The City of Brighton and Hove | Farmhouse | 1770s | 13 October 1952 | TQ3127304188; 50°49′21″N 0°08′16″W | 1380680 | The Royal Pavilion More images |
| The West Pier | The City of Brighton and Hove | Kiosk | 1865-1866 | 9 October 1969 | TQ3027603796; 50°49′09″N 0°09′07″W | 1381655 | The West Pier More images |

== Wealden ==
| Name | Location | Type | Completed | Date designated | Grid ref. Geo-coordinates | Entry number | Image |
|---|---|---|---|---|---|---|---|
| Alciston Parish Church | Alciston, Wealden | Parish Church | Norman | 30 August 1966 | TQ5058505551; 50°49′48″N 0°08′13″E | 1353272 | Alciston Parish Church More images |
| Tithe Barn South West of Court House Farm | Alciston, Wealden | Abbey | Probably 16th century | 13 October 1952 | TQ5050505515; 50°49′47″N 0°08′09″E | 1191019 | Tithe Barn South West of Court House Farm More images |
| Church of St Andrew | Alfriston, Wealden | Parish Church | c. 1360 | 30 August 1966 | TQ5215103001; 50°48′24″N 0°09′29″E | 1043353 | Church of St Andrew More images |
| The Market Cross | Alfriston, Wealden | Market Cross | Medieval | 13 October 1952 | TQ5204203164; 50°48′29″N 0°09′24″E | 1353268 | The Market Cross More images |
| Michelham Priory Barbican Tower and Bridge over the Moat | Milton Hide, Arlington, Wealden | Tower | 15th century | 30 August 1966 | TQ5581209377; 50°51′46″N 0°12′46″E | 1191633 | Michelham Priory Barbican Tower and Bridge over the Moat More images |
| Michelham Priory | Milton Hide, Arlington, Wealden | Augustinian Monastery | 13th century | 13 October 1952 | TQ5588809319; 50°51′45″N 0°12′49″E | 1353289 | Michelham Priory More images |
| Church of St Pancras | Arlington, Wealden | Parish Church | Norman Transitional | 30 August 1966 | TQ5428307468; 50°50′46″N 0°11′25″E | 1353287 | Church of St Pancras More images |
| Church of St Michael and All Angels | Berwick, Wealden | Parish Church | 13th century | 30 August 1966 | TQ5188404921; 50°49′26″N 0°09′18″E | 1043294 | Church of St Michael and All Angels More images |
| Church of St Margaret | Buxted, Wealden | Parish Church | 13th century | 26 November 1953 | TQ4859723042; 50°59′15″N 0°06′57″E | 1028437 | Church of St Margaret More images |
| Church of St Bartholomew | Chalvington with Ripe, Wealden | Parish Church | 13th century | 30 August 1966 | TQ5189809334; 50°51′49″N 0°09′25″E | 1286911 | Church of St Bartholomew More images |
| Church of St John the Baptist | Chalvington with Ripe, Wealden | Parish Church | Perpendicular | 30 August 1966 | TQ5138609862; 50°52′06″N 0°09′00″E | 1043087 | Church of St John the Baptist More images |
| Chiddingly Parish Church | Chiddingly, Wealden | Parish Church | 13th century | 30 August 1966 | TQ5446614156; 50°54′22″N 0°11′44″E | 1353279 | Chiddingly Parish Church More images |
| Lullington Parish Church | Lullington, Cuckmere Valley, Wealden | Parish Church | 13th century or early 14th century | 30 August 1966 | TQ5282303057; 50°48′25″N 0°10′03″E | 1182150 | Lullington Parish Church More images |
| Church of All Saints | Westdean, Cuckmere Valley, Wealden | Parish Church | Norman | 30 August 1966 | TV5250699691; 50°46′36″N 0°09′42″E | 1184445 | Church of All Saints More images |
| Church of St Michael the Archangel | Litlington, Cuckmere Valley, Wealden | Parish Church | 12th century | 30 August 1966 | TQ5233801955; 50°47′50″N 0°09′37″E | 1353380 | Church of St Michael the Archangel More images |
| Friston Place | East Dean and Friston, Wealden | House | 16th century | 13 October 1952 | TV5484898840; 50°46′07″N 0°11′40″E | 1353299 | Friston Place More images |
| Church of Saint James | Friston, East Dean and Friston, Wealden | Parish Church | Saxon | 30 August 1966 | TV5517298181; 50°45′45″N 0°11′56″E | 1043259 | Church of Saint James More images |
| Church of St Simon and St Jude | East Dean and Friston, Wealden | Parish Church | Saxon | 30 August 1966 | TV5573197699; 50°45′29″N 0°12′24″E | 1366117 | Church of St Simon and St Jude More images |
| Sheffield Park House | Sheffield Park Gardens, Fletching, Wealden | House | About 1779 | 26 November 1953 | TQ4135524138; 50°59′57″N 0°00′47″E | 1028395 | Sheffield Park House More images |
| Church of St Andrew and St Mary | Fletching, Wealden | Parish Church | Norman | 31 December 1982 | TQ4290423460; 50°59′34″N 0°02′06″E | 1028414 | Church of St Andrew and St Mary More images |
| Hammerwood Park | Hammerwood, Forest Row, Wealden | House | c. 1795 | 26 November 1953 | TQ4422238852; 51°07′51″N 0°03′35″E | 1191730 | Hammerwood Park More images |
| Bayham Abbey Ruins | Frant, Wealden | Abbey | Founded about 1200 | 26 November 1953 | TQ6501936498; 51°06′15″N 0°21′20″E | 1192095 | Bayham Abbey Ruins More images |
| Church of Saint Mary | Hailsham, Wealden | Parish Church | c. 1425 | 30 August 1966 | TQ5916609498; 50°51′47″N 0°15′37″E | 1043232 | Church of Saint Mary More images |
| Holwych Farmhouse | Cowden, Hartfield, Wealden | House | 17th century or earlier | 26 November 1953 | TQ4837640236; 51°08′32″N 0°07′11″E | 1286541 | Upload Photo |
| Church of St Mary | Hartfield, Wealden | Parish Church | 13th century | 26 November 1953 | TQ4796635722; 51°06′06″N 0°06′43″E | 1192522 | Church of St Mary More images |
| Church of All Saints | Waldron Village, Heathfield and Waldron, Wealden | Parish Church | 13th century | 30 August 1966 | TQ5490019227; 50°57′06″N 0°12′14″E | 1284195 | Church of All Saints More images |
| Horselunges Manor | Hellingly, Wealden | House | Early 15th century | 13 October 1952 | TQ5821512010; 50°53′09″N 0°14′53″E | 1285385 | Horselunges Manor More images |
| Church of St Peter and St Paul | Hellingly, Wealden | Parish Church | Transitional Norman | 30 August 1966 | TQ5808412302; 50°53′19″N 0°14′46″E | 1043186 | Church of St Peter and St Paul More images |
| Herstmonceux Castle with Attached Bridges to North and South and Causeway with Moat Retaining Walls to West | Herstmonceux Park, Herstmonceux, Wealden | Castle | c. 1441 | 24 July 1989 | TQ6465210335; 50°52′09″N 0°20′19″E | 1272785 | Herstmonceux Castle with Attached Bridges to North and South and Causeway with Moat Retaining Walls to West More images |
| Herstmonceux Place | Herstmonceux, Wealden | Flats | Early 18th century | 13 October 1952 | TQ6393711082; 50°52′34″N 0°19′44″E | 1043172 | Herstmonceux Place More images |
| Church of All Saints | Herstmonceux, Wealden | Parish Church | Late 12th century | 30 August 1966 | TQ6427110186; 50°52′04″N 0°19′59″E | 1353333 | Church of All Saints More images |
| Church of St Oswald | Hooe, Wealden | Parish Church | 13th century | 30 August 1966 | TQ6827409168; 50°51′27″N 0°23′22″E | 1043159 | Church of St Oswald More images |
| Church of St Margaret | Isfield, Wealden | Parish Church | 12th century | 26 November 1953 | TQ4438818125; 50°56′40″N 0°03′14″E | 1353561 | Church of St Margaret More images |
| Church of All Saints | Laughton, Wealden | Parish Church | 13th century | 30 August 1966 | TQ5007212575; 50°53′35″N 0°07′57″E | 1181698 | Church of All Saints More images |
| Church of Saint Peter | Folkington, Long Man, Wealden | Parish Church | 13th century | 30 August 1966 | TQ5593803804; 50°48′46″N 0°12′44″E | 1193438 | Church of Saint Peter More images |
| Church of St Mary and St Peter | The Street, Long Man, Wealden | Parish Church | 12th century | 30 August 1966 | TQ5441104280; 50°49′03″N 0°11′26″E | 1028509 | Church of St Mary and St Peter More images |
| Wilmington Priory | The Street, Long Man, Wealden | House | 13th century | 30 August 1966 | TQ5438904254; 50°49′02″N 0°11′25″E | 1185052 | Wilmington Priory More images |
| Church of St Bartholomew | Maresfield, Wealden | Parish Church | c. 1080 | 26 November 1953 | TQ4658624017; 50°59′49″N 0°05′15″E | 1192995 | Church of St Bartholomew More images |
| Middle House Hotel | Mayfield and Five Ashes, Wealden | Hotel | 1575 | 26 November 1953 | TQ5870626983; 51°01′13″N 0°15′41″E | 1028215 | Middle House Hotel More images |
| The Old Palace (the Convent of the Holy Child Jesus, St Leonard's Mayfield School) | Mayfield and Five Ashes, Wealden | Archbishops Palace | 13th century | 26 November 1953 | TQ5873627111; 51°01′17″N 0°15′43″E | 1353594 | The Old Palace (the Convent of the Holy Child Jesus, St Leonard's Mayfield School) More images |
| Church of St Dunstan | Mayfield and Five Ashes, Wealden | Parish Church | 13th century | 26 November 1953 | TQ5864827027; 51°01′15″N 0°15′38″E | 1193663 | Church of St Dunstan More images |
| Church of St Mary | Ninfield, Wealden | Parish Church | 13th century | 30 August 1966 | TQ7050212288; 50°53′06″N 0°25′21″E | 1182294 | Church of St Mary More images |
| Church of St Nicolas | Pevensey, Wealden | Parish Church | 13th century | 30 August 1966 | TQ6469604835; 50°49′11″N 0°20′12″E | 1353406 | Church of St Nicolas More images |
| Church of St Denys | Rotherfield, Wealden | Parish Church | 13th century | 26 November 1953 | TQ5560529750; 51°02′46″N 0°13′06″E | 1193874 | Church of St Denys More images |
| Church of St Peter and St Paul | Wadhurst, Wealden | Parish Church | 12th century | 26 November 1953 | TQ6407131871; 51°03′46″N 0°20′24″E | 1028097 | Church of St Peter and St Paul More images |
| The New House | Wadhurst Park, Wadhurst, Wealden | Country House | 1982-1986 | 2 July 2020 | TQ6323328810; 51°02′08″N 0°19′36″E | 1457638 | Upload Photo |
| Church of St Mary Magdalene | Wartling, Wealden | Parish Church | 13th century | 30 August 1966 | TQ6578009162; 50°51′30″N 0°21′15″E | 1353420 | Church of St Mary Magdalene More images |
| Church of St Mary | Westham, Wealden | Parish Church | Medieval | 30 August 1966 | TQ6416404588; 50°49′03″N 0°19′45″E | 1353431 | Church of St Mary More images |
| Church of St Andrew | Willingdon and Jevington, Wealden | Parish Church | Saxon | 30 August 1966 | TQ5614301508; 50°47′32″N 0°12′50″E | 1043127 | Church of St Andrew More images |
| Church of St Mary the Virgin | Willingdon and Jevington, Wealden | Parish Church | Late 12th century to early 13th century | 30 August 1966 | TQ5894302452; 50°47′59″N 0°15′15″E | 1184822 | Church of St Mary the Virgin More images |
| 1–11 Church Street | The Hoo, Willingdon and Jevington, Wealden | House | 1902 | 10 December 1973 | TQ5889002406; 50°47′58″N 0°15′12″E | 1184911 | 1–11 Church Street More images |
| Church of St Michael | Withyham, Wealden | Parish Church | Medieval | 26 November 1953 | TQ4939535564; 51°06′00″N 0°07′56″E | 1180384 | Church of St Michael More images |

== See also ==
- Grade II* listed buildings in East Sussex
