= Wadham New Cut =

River in East Sussex, England

Coordinates: 50.8333°N 0.2699°E

Wadham New Cut is a minor, 667-metre (2,188 ft) long river (brook) and drainage ditch of the Pevensey Levels in the civil parish of Westham, Wealden District of East Sussex, England, that is a tributary to Winters Cut. Rising from Duckpuddle north of the A27 road—forming the boundary between the civil parish of Polegate—Wadham New Cut flows northeasterly for the entirety of its course.
