= Otham Court Ditch =

River in East Sussex, England

Otham Court Ditch is a 614-metre (2,014 ft) long river (brook) and drainage ditch of the Pevensey Levels in the civil parish of Westham, Wealden District of East Sussex, England.

== Course ==
Divided into two streams, the larger one, 544 metres (1,785 ft) in length, rises from Otham Feed and flows southeasterly into Winters Cut, itself a tributary of Marland Sewer. The second, smaller 70-metre (230 ft)-long stream rises at the confluence of Duck Puddle and Winters Cut, flowing northerly into the larger stream. Both rivers are located just north of the civil parish of Polegate.
