= Swanborough Manor =

Building in Iford, East Sussex, England

- The gatehouse and hall of Swanborough Manor (facing north)

General information
- Location: Iford, East Sussex, England, United Kingdom
- Coordinates: 50.8527°N 0.0110°W

Listed Building – Grade I
- Official name: Swanborough Manor and the Dovecot to Northwest of the House
- Type: Grade I
- Designated: 17 March 1952
- Reference no.: 1274722

Swanborough Manor is a listed English manor dating back to the 12th century in Iford, East Sussex.

== Overview ==
It is located on Swanborough Drove in Iford, East Sussex.

It was first built in about 1200. The medieval grange consists of a hall (originally of a single floor) which had a small chapel in its eastern end (accessed through an interior doorway and small quatrefoil squint) and a 13th-14th century interior gatehouse adjacent to the west. During the later Middle Ages (15th century) the buildings were heavily modernised, the hall was split in two by insertion of a floor, its walls were raised, lancets blocked and three new two-light trefoil-headed windows made. Two interior fireplaces, roof timbers and restored wood panelling probably date from this medieval rebuilding. Probably from this period is also the small pigeon loft. In the outside north wall there are three carved corbels that probably once held the roof of a small buttery.

One of the three corbels in the hall’s north wall

It was listed as Grade I by English Heritage in 1952.

== History ==
It was probably built circa 1200 as a grange belonging to nearby Lewes Priory. After its dissolution, it together with many other Lewes estates was granted to Thomas Cromwell (1485 - 1540) and his heirs.

More recently, it belonged to Rufus Isaacs, 1st Marquess of Reading and Stella Isaacs, Marchioness of Reading (1894-1971). After her death, Stella, a.k.a. Baroness Swanborough, donated it to the University of Sussex located in Falmer, to be used as a residence for the Vice-Chancellor. However, from 1971 to 1985, it was used as housing for postgraduates and lecturers. It was only used as the main residence of the Vice-Chancellor from 1985 to 1997.

However, former Vice-Chancellor Alasdair Smith sold it in 2003, arguing the upkeep was too costly for the university. Baroness Swanborough's step-great-grandson, Simon Isaacs, 4th Marquess of Reading, openly criticized the university for selling it, adding that the university should have striven to find ways to keep it for at least fifty years after her death, in 2021, according to her wishes.
