= Otham Feed =

River in East Sussex, England

Coordinates: 50.8381°N 0.2608°E

Otham Feed is a minor, 532-metre (1,745 ft) long river (brook) and drainage ditch of the Pevensey Levels in the civil parish of Westham, Wealden District of East Sussex, England. It gives rise to Otham Court Ditch.

== Course ==
Rising from water accumulated in Oggs Wood just north of the civil parish of Polegate, Otham Feed flows a northwesterly course for 346 metres (1,135 ft). It then flows easterly for another 186 metres (610 ft), before finally giving rise to Otham Court Ditch.
