= Winters Cut =

River in East Sussex, England

Coordinates: 50.8357°N 0.2672°E

Winters Cut is the name of three streams (brooks) or drainage ditches of the Pevensey Levels in the civil parish of Westham, Wealden District of East Sussex, England. They total a length of 1.6 kilometres (0.99 mi). All streams are located just northeast of the boundary with the civil parish of Polegate, which is marked by the A27 road.

== Streams ==
The first, 451 metres (1,480 ft) long, flows northerly into Downwash Ditch, also meeting the confluence of Saltmarsh Sewer. The second, 383-metre (1,257 ft)-long stream rises at Otham Court Ditch and flows northeasterly into Marland Sewer. Finally, the third stream, 785 metres (2,575 ft) long, flows northwesterly. After receiving the waters of Wadham New Cut, this Winters Cut stream merges with Duckpuddle to give rise to Otham Court Ditch.
