= Downwash Ditch =

River in East Sussex, England

Coordinates: 50.8430°N 0.2631°E

Downwash Ditch is a 1.4-kilometre (0.87 mi) long river (brook) and drainage ditch of the Pevensey Levels in the civil parish of Hailsham, Wealden District of East Sussex, England. Rising in the Honeycrocks, Downwash Ditch flows a westerly course into Winters Cut, giving rise to a stream of Saltmarsh Sewer just north of the Westham civil parish.
