= Holm Sewer =

River and drainage ditch in East Sussex, England

Coordinates: 50.8403°N 0.2685°E

Holm Sewer is a minor river (brook) and drainage ditch of the Pevensey Levels in Hailsham, Wealden District of East Sussex, England. A tributary to Marland Sewer, Holm Sewer drains water from farmland east of the B2104 road and flows easterly. It receives water from Saltmarsh Sewer.
