= St Mary's Church, Westham =

St Mary's Church
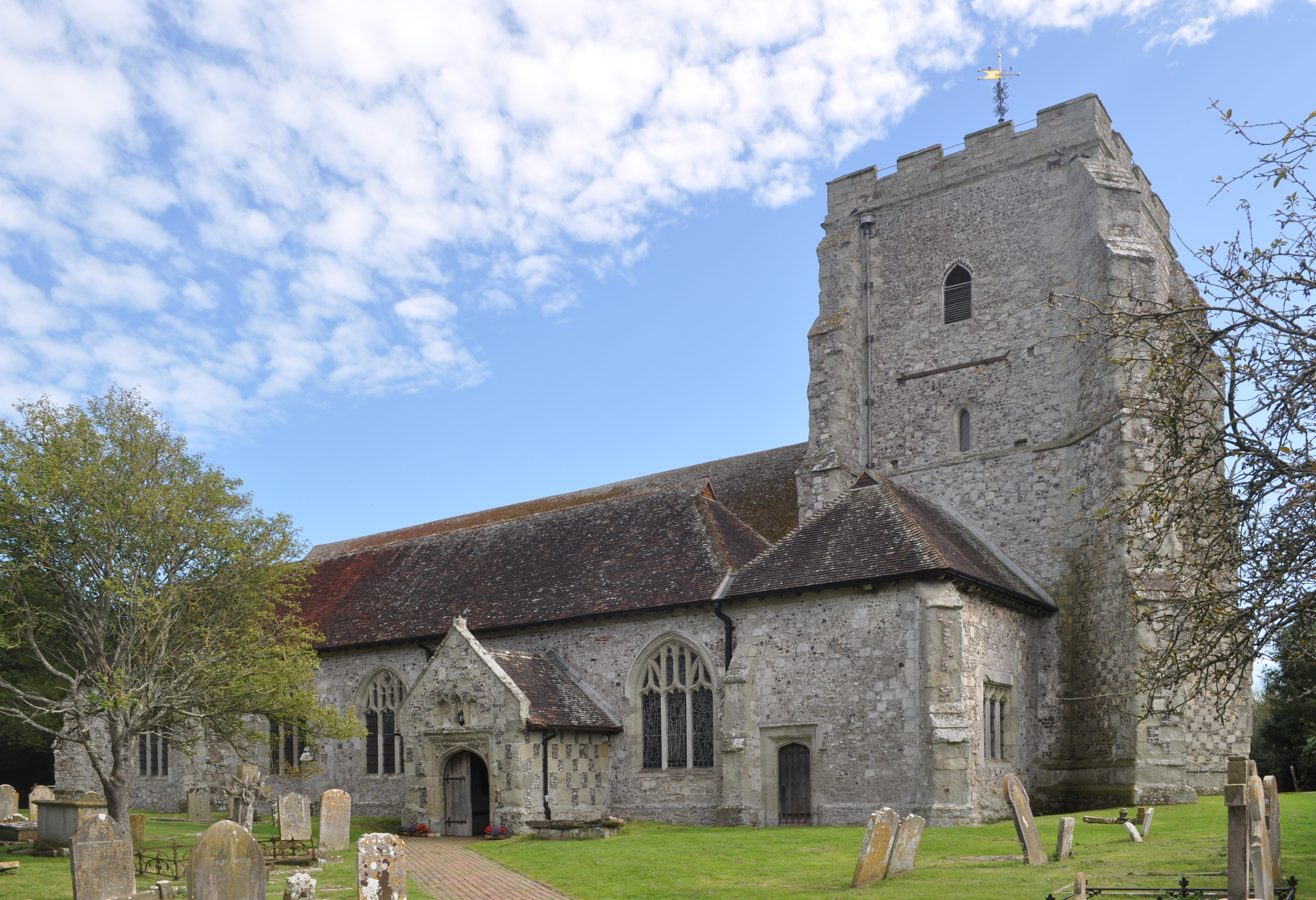
- The church from the southeast in 2023
- St Mary's Church
- 50.8176°N 0.3291°E
- Location: High Street, Westham, Pevensey, East Sussex BN24 5LL
- Country: England
- Denomination: Church of England

History
- Status: Parish church
- Founded: 11th century
- Dedication: Mary

Architecture
- Functional status: Active
- Style: Norman

Administration
- Province: Canterbury
- Diocese: Chichester
- Archdeaconry: Lewes and Hastings
- Deanery: Rural Deanery of Eastbourne
- Parish: Westham: St Mary

Clergy
- Vicar: Revd Canon Dr David Gillard

Listed Building – Grade I
- Official name: The Parish Church of St Mary
- Designated: 30 August 1966
- Reference no.: 1353431

St Mary's Church, Westham, is an active Anglican parish church in High Street, Westham, East Sussex, England, standing to the west of Pevensey Castle. The earliest fabric in the church, in the south wall of the nave and in the transept, dates from the late 11th century. The north aisle and the tower were added to the church in the late 14th century. The chancel was either rebuilt or remodelled in about 1420. During the 1870s restorations were carried out, including one by the Lancaster architects Paley and Austin in 1876–77, when the seating was increased from 297 to 403. The church is constructed in flint with stone dressings and a tiled roof. Its plan consists of a nave with a north aisle and a north porch, a south transept, a chancel with a north chapel, and a west tower.

The tower contains six bells, the heaviest weighing over 10-1-10cwt (525 kg) and being tuned to G major and being cast in 1921. The tenor bell, originally cast in 1789 and recast in 1921 with the other bells, is engraved with a war memorial, listing the bell ringers of the village lost during the Great War. The church has an active band of bell ringers, which is affiliated to the Eastern District of the Sussex Country Association of Change Ringers. Following the death of Queen Elizabeth II on 8 September the bells were rung fully muffled until the day after the state funeral on 19 September 2022, as part of Operation London Bridge.

The church is recorded in the National Heritage List for England as a designated Grade I listed building.

== The church today ==
St Mary's Church was listed at Grade I by English Heritage on 30 August 1966. Such buildings are defined as being of "exceptional interest" and greater than national importance. As of February 2001, it was one of 47 Grade I listed buildings, and 2,173 listed buildings of all grades, in the district of Wealden.

The parish covers an extensive rural area in the district of Wealden. It includes Westham village, the hamlets of Hankham and Rickney, an area of coastal development between Pevensey Bay village and the edge of Eastbourne, and a small suburban area of Eastbourne around the former hamlet of Friday Street.

== See also ==
- Grade I listed buildings in East Sussex
- List of current places of worship in Wealden
- List of ecclesiastical works by Paley and Austin
