= Duckpuddle (disambiguation) =

Duckpuddle is a river in the Pevensey Levels of East Sussex, England.

Duckpuddle may also refer to:

- Duckpuddle Pond, a lake in Lincoln County, Maine, United States
- Duckpuddle Run, a river in Monroe County, Pennsylvania, United States
- A puddle in which a duck is residing
