= Saltmarsh Sewer =

River in East Sussex, England

Coordinates: 50.8426°N 0.2752°E

Saltmarsh Sewer is a minor river (brook) and drainage ditch of the Pevensey Levels in Hailsham, Wealden District of East Sussex, England. Comprising multiple ditches, Saltmarsh Sewer drains water from farmland east of the B2104 road, and is a tributary to Glynleigh Sewer. Additional streams also flow into Holm Sewer, Downwash Ditch and Winters Cut. Two pumping stations are located along the course of Saltmarsh Sewer.
