= Pevensey Court House =

Municipal building in Pevensey, East Sussex, England

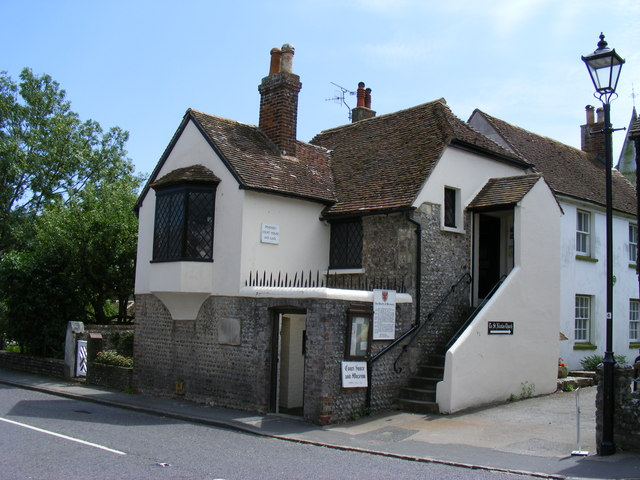
- Pevensey Court House

- Shown in East Sussex
- 50.8201°N 0.3364°E
- Location: High Street, Pevensey

History
- Built: 1540

Site notes
- Architectural style: Medieval style

Listed Building – Grade II
- Official name: The Court House and Wallby
- Designated: 30 August 1966
- Reference no.: 1182588

Pevensey Court House, formerly known as Pevensey Town Hall, is a municipal building in the High Street, Pevensey, East Sussex, England. The structure, which currently accommodates a local history museum, is a Grade II listed building.

== History ==
The current building, which was commissioned to replace a 14th-century court house, was designed in the medieval style, built in rubble masonry and was completed in around 1540. It was then extended, with the construction of a north facing wing and the installation of a porch at the top of the external staircase, in 1830. A cement render finish was added at that time as well.

The design of the enlarged building involved a main block which was orientated east to west together with a north facing wing. It featured an external staircase on the eastern side leading up to a porch on the first floor. The building was fenestrated by a prominent oriel window on the first floor at the end of the north facing wing, and by a casement window on the right-hand side of the main block, also facing north. The north facing wing was gabled and the main block was covered by a hipped roof. Internally, the principal rooms were a lock-up for incarcerating petty criminals on the ground floor, and a courtroom, which was 18 feet (5.5 m) long and 14 feet (4.3 m) wide, as well as a robing room, on the first floor.

The borough council, which had met in the council chamber, was abolished under the Municipal Corporations Act 1883, and the assets of the borough, including the building, were transferred to the newly formed Pevensey Town Trust in 1890.

One of the last people to be incarcerated in the prison cells was Betty Breach, who was found guilty of assaulting her drunken husband in 1887: after local protests, the magistrate who had sentenced Breach, apologised and released her. The building was used to imprison a captured German airman and was also used as a mortuary during the Second World War.

The court house subsequently served as a museum. Exhibits accessioned to the collection included the seals of the borough which dated to around 1230, the official weights and measures of the borough, and a replica of a scene from the Bayeux Tapestry, depicting the landing of William the Conqueror at Pevensey in 1066, which was hand-embroidered in the 1980s.
