= St Nicolas Church, Pevensey =

St Nicolas' Church
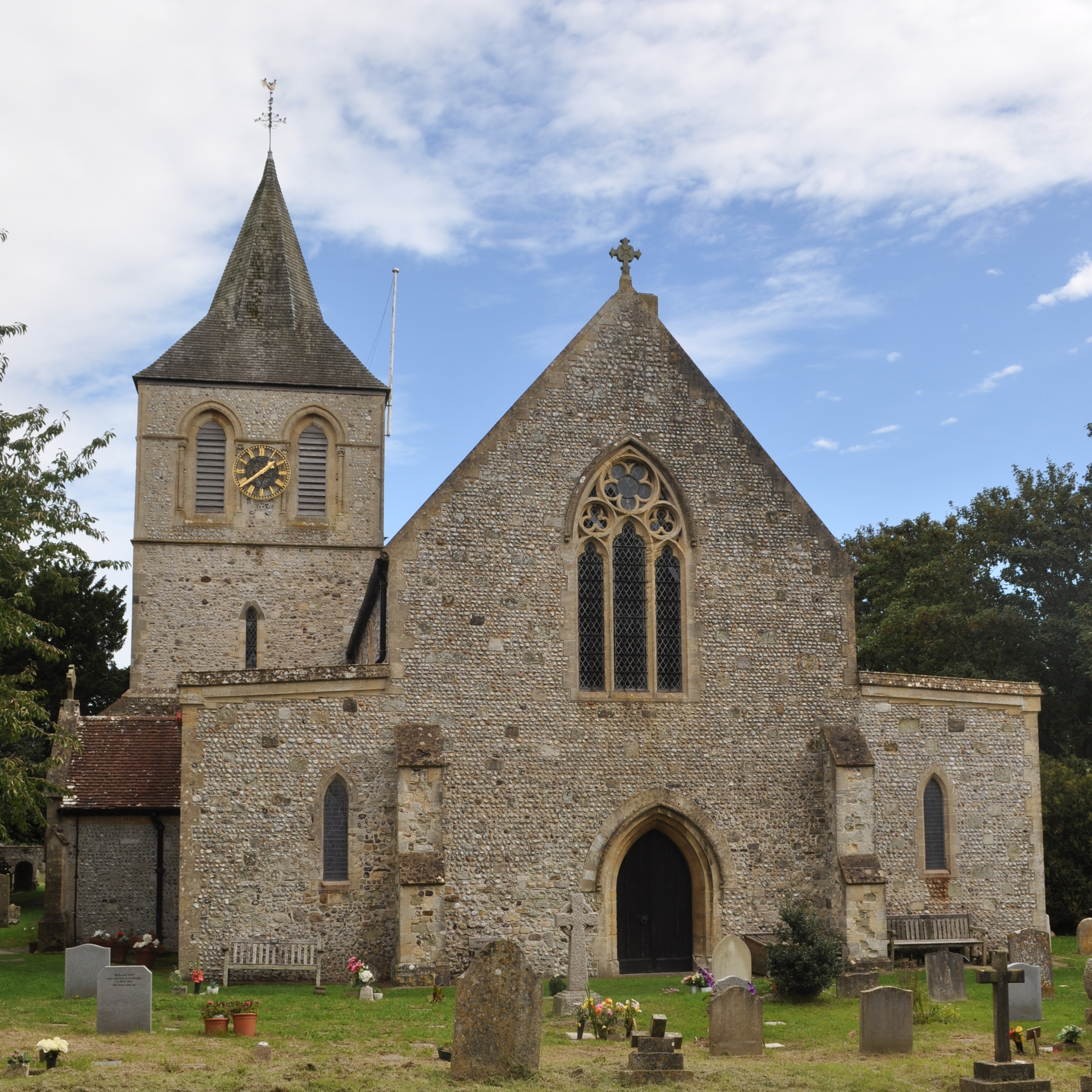
- The church from the west-northwest in 2023
- St Nicolas' Church
- 50.8196°N 0.3368°E
- Location: Church Lane, Pevensey, East Sussex BN24 5LD
- Country: England
- Denomination: Church of England
- Churchmanship: Traditional Anglo-Catholic

History
- Status: Parish church
- Founded: 12th/13th century
- Dedication: Saint Nicholas

Architecture
- Functional status: Active
- Style: Early English Gothic

Administration
- Province: Canterbury
- Diocese: Chichester
- Archdeaconry: Hastings
- Deanery: Eastbourne
- Parish: Pevensey

Listed Building – Grade I
- Official name: The Parish Church of St Nicolas
- Designated: 30 August 1966
- Reference no.: 1353406

St Nicolas' Church is the Anglican parish church of the village of Pevensey in the Wealden district of East Sussex, England. The church is a Grade I Listed building.

== History ==
St. Nicolas Church is the parish church of Pevensey, with its daughter church, St. Wilfrid's, serving Pevensey Bay. It is named after Saint Nicholas, the patron saint of seafarers. The Church’s origins can be traced to the Roman occupation of Britain and is built on the original site of a Saxon or Priory church dating from the fifth century, which at the time would have overlooked the sea, now some 1/2 mile distant. The Church we see today was built in its present form in the medieval period, between 1205 and 1216.

The completed St Nicolas Church remains a splendid example of ‘Early English’, or ‘Early English Gothic’, architecture. England's Gothic architectural tradition originated in France in the mid 12th century and spread rapidly to England. It is the plainest and closest to French building styles of the period. It is typified by the simplicity of its vaults and tracery, the use of lancet windows and smaller amounts of sculptural decoration than either Romanesque or later varieties of Gothic church building.

St. Nicolas’ size and relative grandeur reflect the importance of Pevensey as a major seaport at the time of its construction. Evidence suggests that it may have been intended to have been even larger by extending it to the west, but this was never carried out.

== Architecture ==
St Nicolas is fortunate to have several notable original architectural features. There are fine examples of medieval windows. The three Lancet window openings above the High Altar are perfect examples of their period c.1200. Also, in the south aisle there are twin windows of Early English style, set in deep mouldings. Both these windows had stained glass installed during the late 19th-century restoration in the reign of Queen Victoria (1819 – 1901).

The Chancel is ‘off-set’ at an angle from the Nave by 34/60ths of one degree. This feature is often seen in medieval churches, and is said to symbolize the angle of Christ’s head upon the cross, but also to give an illusion of increased building length. The stone Chancel arches have acutely pointed capitals of stiff foliage. These are a distinctive feature of the ‘Early English’ church building style.

The Chancel was built and roofed in the reign of King John in c.1205. It has a high, cradle roof construction which is impressive for its simplicity of hand sawn and hand jointed Sussex oak workmanship, and of great beauty. It was quite likely made by local shipbuilders. It shows uniform, shaped frames built and erected along a keel to form the internal framework and then over turned to form the arched roof. It is mostly original and has survived practically unchanged.

The Nave was built c.1210 in the reign of King Henry lll. One of the most conspicuous features in the Nave are the double-chamfered arches. Three on the north and five on the south side. These are supported on columns which are alternately clustered, with quatrefoil designs, and octagonal. The Clerestory windows are between the arches and not in the traditional place, which is to be above them. Cut into the pillars of the Nave are two niches which held small sacred figures. The figures are likely to have been destroyed during the Protestant Reformation in the early 16th century.

The oak ‘waggon’ roof of the Nave (being a Cradle-roof constructed of a closely spaced series of double arch-braced trusses, suggesting the shape of a covered wagon), was a necessary part of the 19th-century restoration but the main beams and king posts are probably original and still sound. For a considerable time previously, the Nave had a false ceiling, above which air circulation was so poor that much of the roof timber had rotted and decayed.

The Norman font is made from stone from Caen, William the Conqueror’s home town, in Normandy. It has an intricate, locally carved Victorian wooden lantern hood, circa 1890. There is also a Muniment Chest (1664), and a replica Offertory Box with a long handle (the original is in safe keeping to avoid theft), used in the days of box pews which may have been owned by wealthy families, or possessed by parish landowners.

On the floor in the South Aisle is an ancient and heavy stone grave cover, thought to be 13th century, with the outline of a darker cross. It is one of two found in the Chancel during the 19th-century restoration. It is likely to have covered the grave of an early incumbent.

The Church porch on the north side, shelters the main door which is double and studded with brass furniture. In the stone surrounds on the east side of the door are three etched Votive or Crusaders’ Crosses, from probably the 13th century. This was at a time when many pilgrims and crusaders would have set off for the European continent and far off destinations from Pevensey, and who duly marked their safe return in this way.

== Memorials ==
In the north aisle is a memorial to John Wheatley (1616), a wealthy local parishioner who contributed £40, (approx. £6,000/US$10,000 in 2011), towards the cost of fitting out and preparing a ship in Pevensey to fight the Spanish Armada of 1588.

There are war memorials to the fallen in two World Wars close to ‘The Boniface Window’. The Boniface family name, with its French roots going back to before the Crusades (1095–1291), became a well known and long established local family. The window was designed by Christopher Webb, a renowned church window artist whose work can also be seen in St Albans Cathedral. Christopher Webb’s father, Sir Aston Webb’s portfolio of work included the design of Admiralty Arch in London and the façade of Buckingham Palace.

== Restoration ==
The earliest restoration works undertaken at the Church are first recorded being made in 1587, 377 years after the building’s construction when the Church is recorded as "very mutche in decaye for lacke of timber and glasse and other reparations."

In Georgian times, from 1714 to 1830, the church was turned into a ’Preaching Box’. The great vaulted Sanctuary ceiling of wood was covered over with plaster and the Sanctuary and Chancel were separated from the Nave by a brick wall. The Sanctuary and Chancel were used as a space for general storage, which included crops from the surrounding countryside, and the products of smuggling as well as being a stable for cattle and sheep which grazed the church yard.

From the late 19th century onwards, several ‘restoration projects’ were undertaken, most notably by George Gilbert Scott, Jr., an eminent ecclesiastical architect of London from 1875, whose father George Gilbert Scott was a pioneering English Gothic revival architect, chiefly associated with the design, building and renovation of churches and cathedrals. Scott Jr. oversaw extensive restorations at St. Nicolas, and the building of the vestry on foundations of a former chantry, and the Chancel floor was raised in steps towards the High Altar.

In 1876 the Sanctuary and Chancel and Nave were reopened to form the Church as we see it today. There is an inscription in the porch which records: "The Incorporated Society for Buildings and Churches granted £230 AD 1876 towards reseating and restoring this church. All the seats are for the free use of parishioners according to law."

The original Church tower having been taken down to the level of the first storey in about 1800, was later raised by the addition of two new storeys and a new shingled broached spire as part of the late 19th Century restoration. This faithfully reflects the original flint boulder and greensand blocks of the original, and was restored in places as part of the 2006 restoration project. The vestry was added in 1887 as part of the extensive restorations being made at that time.

In 1908 a 2-sided tower clock was installed, by Smiths of Derby who continue to maintain it. Six church bells were also rehung at this time. Three of the six bells date from the 17th century. The earliest of these was originally cast in 1633, the second in 1676. All are rung every week by our bell ringers. The bell chamber within the tower is accessed by a cast iron Victorian spiral staircase

== Uses ==
St Nicolas' Church was designated a Grade I Listed building on 30 August 1966.

Parish Registers of Births, Marriages and Deaths date from 1569, the early originals being with the East Sussex County Archives in the County town of Lewes. A full survey and record of the gravestones and memorials in St. Nicolas Church and graveyard was made in 1995.

A by-product of the Church’s design and construction are its acoustics. In recent years internationally known professional, London-based musicians from the Orchestra of the Age of Enlightenment, the Royal Academy of Music and BBC Concert Orchestra, to mention a few, have played concerts in the Church because they appreciate the exceptional clarity of the acoustics.

It is the oldest building in Pevensey still used for its original purpose. It is used throughout the year for Christian worship using the Book of Common Prayer forms of service, published in 1662, and used ever since. Because of its attractive location, history and splendour, St. Nicolas is a popular venue for weddings, baptisms and funerals.

== See also ==
- Grade I listed buildings in East Sussex
- List of current places of worship in Wealden
- St. George's Episcopal Memorial Church, a church in the US with a stained glass window containing shards of glass collected from this church when it was damaged in World War II.
