= St Nicholas Church, Iford =

Church of St Nicholas
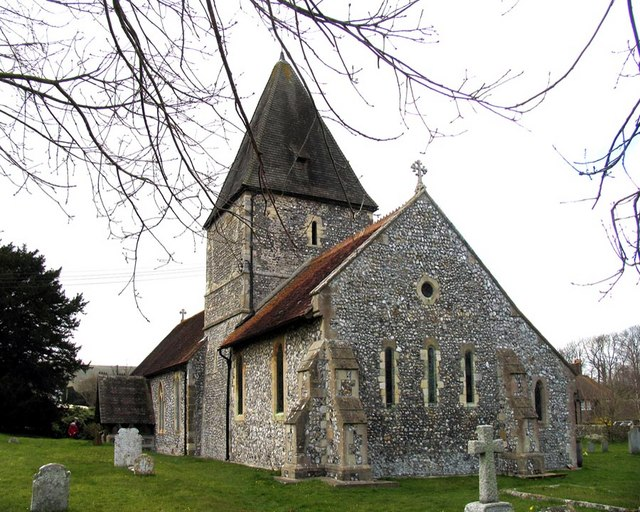
- Viewed from the east
- Church of St Nicholas
- 50°50′54.240″N 0°0′2.927″W
- OS grid reference: TQ 408 073
- Location: Iford, East Sussex
- Country: England
- Denomination: Church of England
- Website: https://www.achurchnearyou.com/church/5008/

History
- Founded: 1090

Administration
- Diocese: Diocese of Chichester
- Parish: Iford

Listed Building – Grade I
- Official name: The Parish Church of St Nicholas
- Designated: 20 August 1965
- Reference no.: 1222119

The Church of St Nicholas is an Anglican church in the village of Iford, East Sussex, England. It is in the Diocese of Chichester, and in the United Benefice of Iford with Kingston, Rodmell and Southease. The building is Grade I listed.

== Description ==
The church was founded in 1090. The tower, with a shingled spire, is situated between the nave and the chancel. It is thought that the tower was built above the original chancel: the nave and the original chancel date from the early 12th century; the tower, supported by two high semicircular arches, and the present chancel were built in the late 12th century.

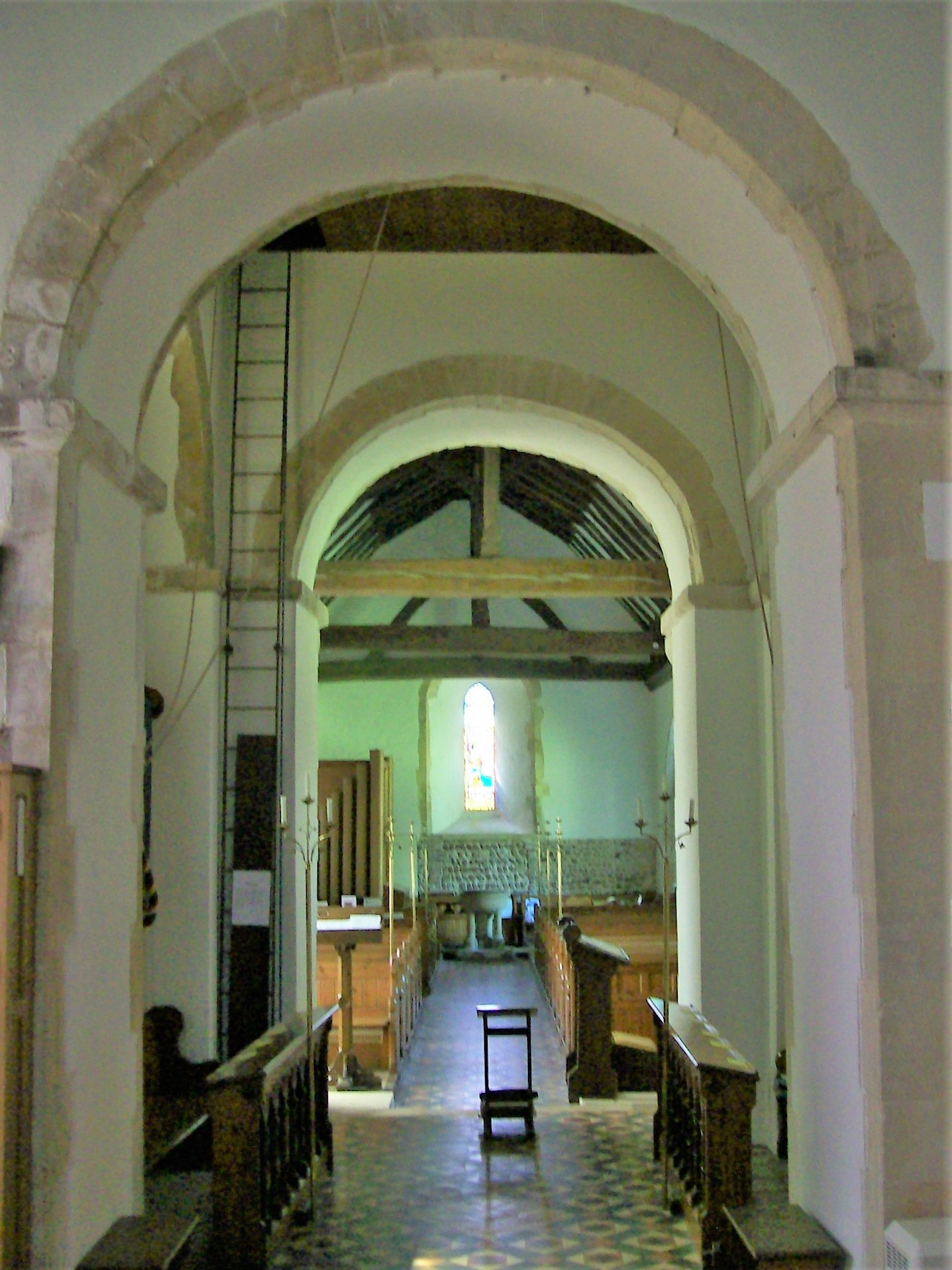
Looking west from the chancel, showing the arches supporting the tower

There are three narrow windows at the east end of the chancel; their rounded heads suggest an early date. A north aisle, created in the late 12th century, was later demolished at an unknown period. Its former presence is shown by three blocked arches in the north wall of the nave.

Restoration took place in 1868, when the concealed north arcade and east windows were discovered. There was further restoration in 1874.

Three bells are in the tower, dating from about 1426, said to be among the oldest in Sussex. They invoke Saints Botulph, Katherine, and Margaret respectively.

== See also ==
- Grade I listed buildings in East Sussex
