= Walter Godfrey (architect) =

English architect (1881–1961)

Walter Hindes Godfrey CBE, FSA, FRIBA
- Born: 2 August 1881
- Died: 16 September 1961 (aged 80)
- Occupation: Architect
- Awards: RIBA Silver Medallist (Essay), 1906
- Practice: Wratten & Godfrey
- Buildings: Burford Priory, Oxfordshire; The Temple Church, Crosby Hall
- Projects: Herstmonceux Castle

Walter Hindes Godfrey (1881–1961), was an English architect, antiquary, and architectural and topographical historian. He was also a landscape architect and designer, and an accomplished draftsman and illustrator. He was (1941–60) the first director and the inspiration behind the foundation of the National Buildings Record, the basis of today's Historic England Archive, and edited or contributed to numerous volumes of the Survey of London. He devised a system of Service Heraldry for recording service in the European War.

Godfrey was appointed a CBE in 1950.

== Early life ==
Walter Hindes Godfrey was born at home at 102, Greenwood Road, Hackney, London, the eldest son of Walter Scott Godfrey, owner of a small wine business, and Gertrude Annie Rendall. His father later gave up his own business to become manager of a larger firm, then became a minister of religion and author of several works on the subject.

Godfrey attended Whitgift Grammar School, then matriculated in June 1898 at the University of London.

== Architect ==
Godfrey first settled in Buxted in 1915, and then moved his practice from London in 1932 to live and have his offices in Lewes House, on Lewes High Street. He was regarded as one of the outstanding conservation architects of his generation, though his interventions are thorough and often unscholarly. He restored and adapted a number of important historic buildings and gardens, chiefly in Sussex and the Weald. They include the Anne of Cleves House Museum in Lewes, Sussex; The Garth, Lingfield in Surrey (1919), where he converted the Old Workhouse (1729) into a residential dwelling and designed the surrounding gardens; Herstmonceux Castle, East Sussex (1933), where his major reconstruction of the interior was in the view of Nikolaus Pevsner executed 'exemplarily'; Charleston Manor, Sussex (1928); Horselunges Manor, Hellingly, Sussex; Michelham Priory, Sussex; Plawhatch Hall and Kidbrooke Park (today Michael Hall School), both near East Grinstead, East Sussex; and Rymans at Apuldram, West Sussex. In London, following war damage in the Blitz, he restored Chelsea Old Church (1953–55) and the historic Temple Church (1947–57); also Crosby Hall, London, reconstructed in Chelsea incorporating elements of the house of Thomas More. Other notable buildings he restored include the Memorial Chapel at Eton College; Dorchester Abbey, Oxfordshire; Old Surrey Hall, Dormansland, Surrey; Goldings in Hertford, Hertfordshire; and many churches, notably in Sussex. In the Cotswolds, his commissions included adaptations to Sudeley Castle and Little Barrow (largely a new work), Donnington, both in Gloucestershire, and Burford Priory, in Oxfordshire.

== Author ==
Godfrey was the author or editor of a wide range of books and articles on architectural history and antiquarian subjects, many of them published by the Sussex Archaeological Society. He was literary director of the Sussex Record Society and chairman of its council. In 2006 a collection of Godfrey's private papers was deposited with the East Sussex Record Office.

== Personal life ==
Godfrey married Gertrude Mary (d. 1955), second daughter of Alexander Grayston Warren, and had three daughters and a son, Emil Godfrey, also an architect, who founded the practice of Carden and Godfrey.

== Bibliography ==
- A History of Architecture in London, arranged to illustrate the course of architecture in England until 1800, with a sketch of the preceding European styles (London: B.T. Batsford, 1911; revised ed. Phoenix House,1962)
- The English Staircase: An Historical Account of its Characteristic Types to the End of the 18th Century (London: B.T. Batsford, 1911)
- The work of George Devey, Fellow of the Royal Institute of British Architects, 1820–1886 (London: Privately published for Messrs Wratten and Godfrey by B.T. Batsford, [190-])
- Some Famous Buildings and their Story, with Sir A. W. Clapham, (1913)
- Gardens in the Making (Batsford, 1914)
- (with Budgen, Walter) Wilmington Priory and The Long Man (Sussex Archaeological Society, 1938)
- The Parish of Chelsea (ed.), Survey of London, vol. 7 (London County Council, 1924)
- The Story of Architecture in England, 2 volumes (London: B.T. Batsford, 1928–31)
- The Village of Highgate (with Sir George Garter) (eds), Survey of London, vol. 12 (London County Council, 1936)
- Our Building Inheritance: are we to use or lose it? (London: Faber and Faber, 1944)
- The English Almshouse with Some Account of Its Predecessor the Medieval Hospital (London: Faber and Faber, 1955)
- A History of Lewes, incorporating a Guide to the County Town (Lewes Borough Council, 1971)
- Lambeth: South Bank and Vauxhall (with Sir Howard Roberts) (eds), Survey of London, volume 23 (London County Council, 1951)
- King's Cross neighbourhood (ed.), Survey of London (London County Council, 1952)
- At the Sign of The Bull, Lewes: with an Account of Thomas Paine's Residence in Lewes by J. M. Connell (London: Eyre & Spottiswoode, n.d)
- Guide to the Church of St Margaret Angmering
- Guide to the Church of St. Mary and St. Gabriel, Harting (Harting Parochial Church Council)
- The Parish of St Pancras (with Percy W. Lovell and W.M. Marcham) (eds), Survey of London, (London County Council)
- Sussex Views: Selected from the Burrell Collections: Being the Jubilee Volume of the Sussex Record Society (with William Burrell, L. F. Salzman and British Library Staff and Sussex Record Society Staff) (eds)
- The College of Arms, Queen Victoria Street (Monograph of the London Survey Committee) (The College of Arms, Queen Victoria Street, 1963)
- Colsoni's Guide de Londres (1693) (ed.)
