= Brickwall House =

House in East Sussex, England

Coordinates: 50°59′37.4″N 0°35′59.6″E

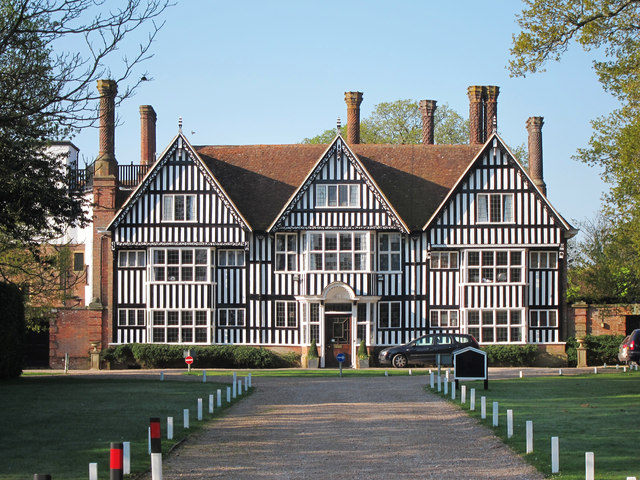
Brickwall House

Brickwall House (formerly known as Down House School and Brickwall House School) is a country house in Northiam, East Sussex, England, now run as a dyslexia school (Frewen College) and also a wedding venue. The timber-framed Tudor house dates to 1617. Brickwall was home to the Frewen family for over three hundred years. The house is a Grade I listed building.

== History ==
Down House School was established in 1910 by Seaburne Godfrey Arthur May Moens, an amateur historian born in India. The school was evacuated to Herefordshire during the Second World War and upon its return settled at Brickwall House.

Down House changed its name to Brickwall House School, and then to Frewen College after Admiral Sir John Frewen GCB transferred the school into an educational trust. Since 1972 the school has specialised in dyslexia and related learning difficulties.
