= Horselunges Manor =

Listed house in Hellingly, East Sussex

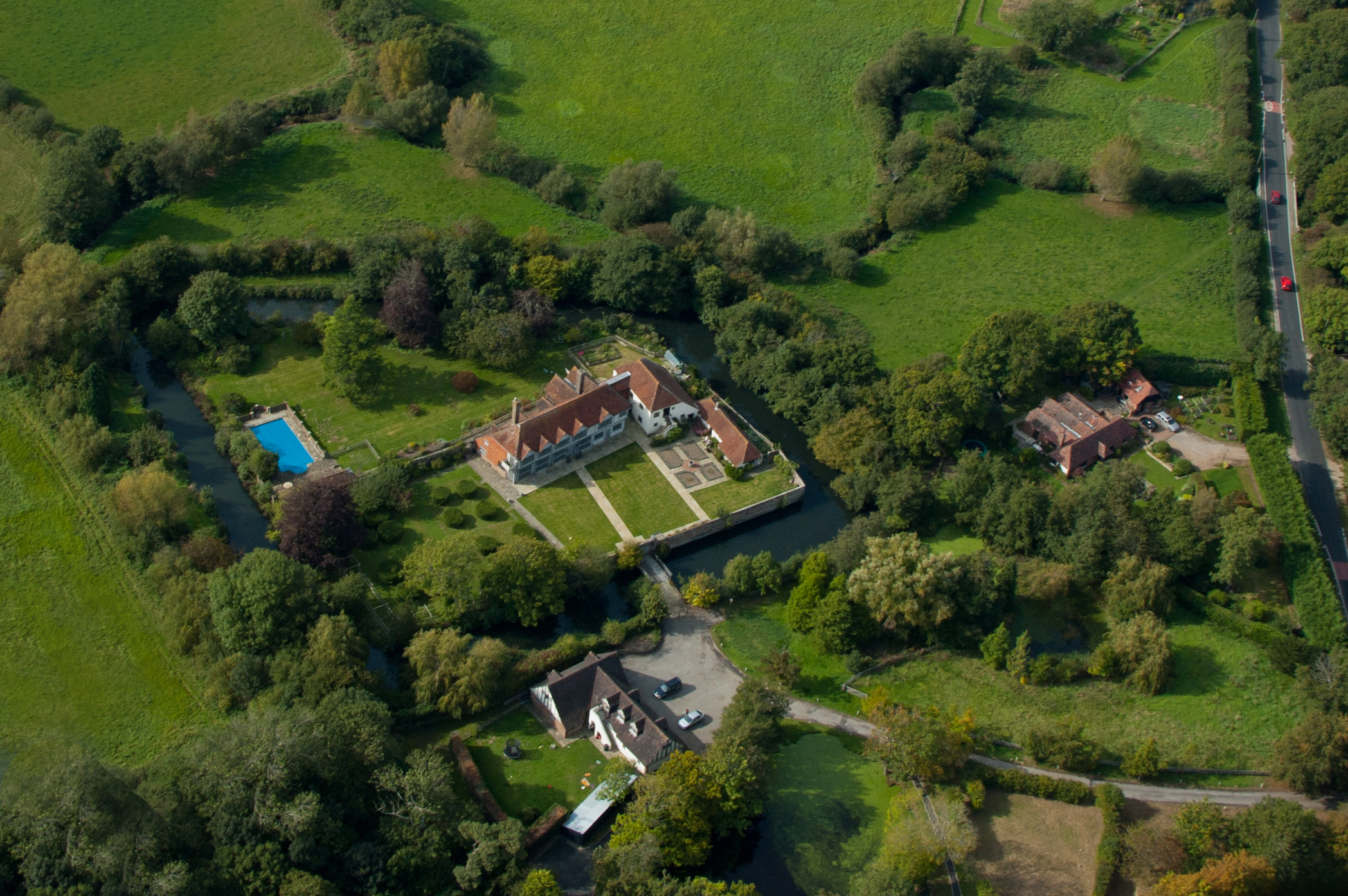
- Aerial view of Horselunges Manor
- Interactive map of the Horselunges Manor area

General information
- Status: Completed
- Type: House
- Classification: Grade I
- Location: Hellingly, East Sussex, England
- Coordinates: 50°53′09″N 0°14′53″E
- Completed: Late 15th century
- Renovated: 1925

Technical details
- Material: Timber
- Size: 1.5 acres (0.61 ha)
- Grounds: 86 acres (35 ha)

Horselunges Manor is a 15th-century manor house in Hellingly, East Sussex, that was restored in the 20th century. The house was previously owned by Peter Grant, the manager of Led Zeppelin, and featured in the film The Song Remains the Same about the band. Horselunges Manor is a Grade I listed building.

== History ==
=== Early period ===
Horselunges Manor was built in the late 15th century by John Devenish, whose family owned the house for a number of generations. The house is situated in Hellingly, East Sussex, around 300 metres (0.19 mi) from the parish church and 2 miles (3.2 km) from Hailsham. The name may have come from the phrase "Hurst-longue", which means "entrance into the wood".

In 1541, Thomas Fiennes, 9th Baron Dacre and his men were involved in an incident whilst poaching near to Horselunges Manor, during which a servant was killed. Fiennes was hanged for the crime.

=== 20th century ===
In the 20th century, the estate was managed by Alfred Linforth Pitman, a veteran of the Battle of Dunkirk. In 1952, the house became a Grade I listed building.

In the early 1970s, Peter Grant, the manager of English rock band Led Zeppelin, purchased the house from its then owner Barbara Doxat. He paid £80,000 for the house, and spent an additional £10,000 on renovating the property. The house featured in the film The Song Remains the Same about Led Zeppelin, and Grant suggested basing Swan Song Records at Horselunges Manor. In 1988, Grant sold the house, and it is currently a private residence.

== Architecture ==
Horselunges Manor is built of timber, and is a two-storey building. The house has an area of 1.5 acres (0.61 ha), and is surrounded by a moat, and has a total of 86 acres (35 ha) of farmland. It may have been built in a quadrangle, though only one side now remains. The house is unusual in that the halls of the buildings do not have aisles. The house was altered in the 16th century, which may have been when the original hall was removed from the house. At that time, a staircase was added to the house. In the 18th century, a stables was built adjacent to the house out of red brick. Attached to the main house, there is a chantry chapel. The house was restored in 1925 by architect Walter Godfrey.

The west side of the estate has a walled garden; historically, the south side of the manor also had a walled garden, though the walls no longer exist. In the 20th century, there was a topiary garden, the remnant of which exist nowadays.
