= Duck Puddle =

River in East Sussex, England

Coordinates: 50.8357°N 0.2672°E

Duck Puddle, or Duckpuddle, is a minor, 1.032-kilometre (0.641 mi) long river (brook) and drainage ditch of the Pevensey Levels in the civil parish of Westham, Wealden District of East Sussex, England. It joins Winters Cut and gives rise to a portion of Otham Court Ditch. Rising just north of the A27 road—forming the boundary between the civil parish of Polegate—Duck Puddle flows northeasterly for most of its course.
