= The Hoo, Willingdon and Jevington =

House in Willingdon and Jevington, East Sussex

The Hoo
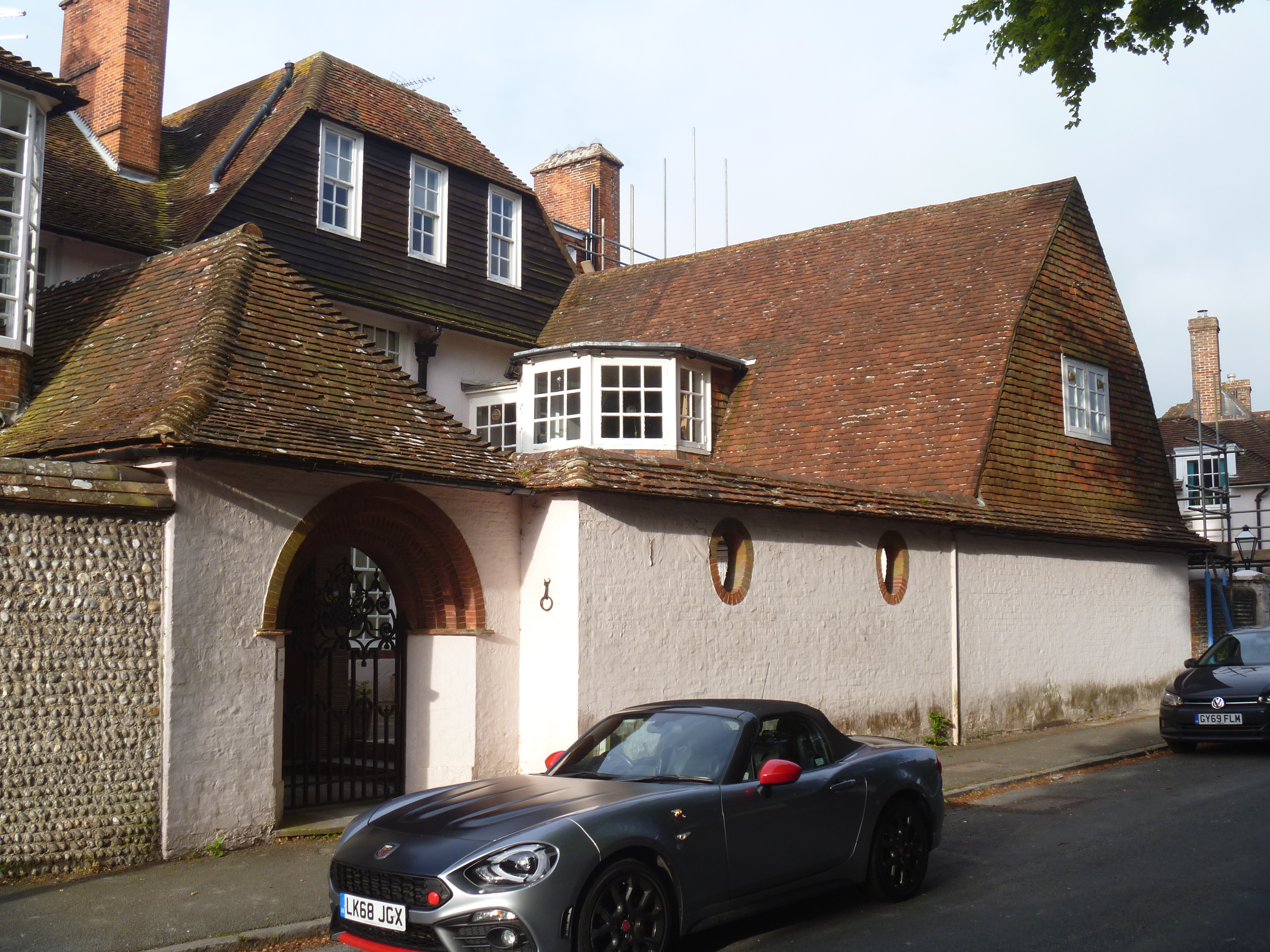
- The Hoo, street frontage

- Location within East Sussex
- 50°47′57″N 0°15′12″E
- Location: Willingdon and Jevington, East Sussex
- OS grid reference: TQ588024

History
- Built: 1902

Site notes
- Architect: Edwin Lutyens
- Architectural style: Neoclassical

Listed Building – Grade I
- Official name: The Hoo
- Designated: 10 December 1973
- Reference no.: 1184911

National Register of Historic Parks and Gardens
- Official name: The Hoo
- Designated: 25 March 1987
- Reference no.: 1000236

Listed Building – Grade II*
- Official name: Garden Walls and 2 Gazebos on South Side of Nos 1 to 11
- Designated: 12 August 1981
- Reference no.: 1353435

Listed Building – Grade II
- Official name: The Barn
- Designated: 12 August 1981
- Reference no.: 1184960

The Hoo is a Neoclassical country house in Willingdon, in the Wealden district of East Sussex, England. It was designed by Edwin Lutyens in 1902 for Alexander Wedderburn, a wealthy lawyer. Considered one of Lutyens' best houses, it is a Grade I listed building. The gardens, which had input from Gertrude Jekyll, are designated at Grade II* on the Register of Historic Parks and Gardens of Special Historic Interest in England.

== History and description ==
Alexander Wedderburn commissioned Edwin Lutyens to undertake a re-modelling of his existing house at Willingdon on the South Downs in 1901. The result was among Lutyens' favourite works, and is considered among his best country houses. After post-war service as a girls' school, the house was converted to apartments in 1955. The building remains privately owned and was the subject of a sympathetic restoration in 2022.

The core of the current house remains Wedderburn's original cottage. To this, Lutyens added a gable roof with dormer windows, while to each side he constructed large wings. There are examples of the neo-Georgian styling which was to become one of Lutyens' major architectural themes.

The original planting scheme for the gardens, which were designed in a formal style, was undertaken by Gertrude Jekyll. Some modifications have been made since, and some of the outlying parts have succumbed to residential development.

The Hoo is a Grade I listed building and its gardens are listed at Grade II* on the Register of Historic Parks and Gardens of Special Historic Interest in England.
