= Pevensey =

Village and parish in East Sussex, England

Coordinates: 50°49′14″N 0°20′17″E

- Village
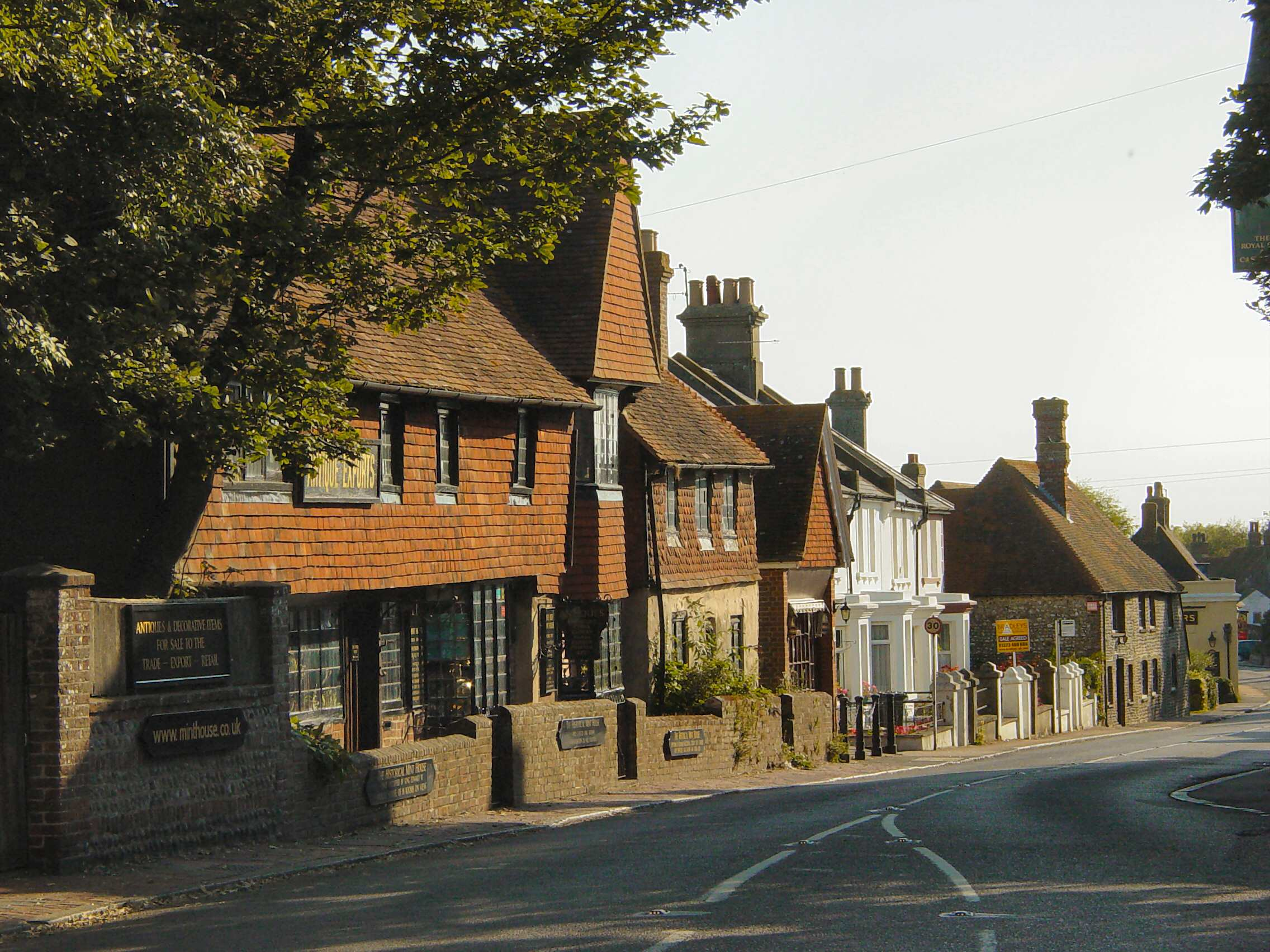
- View of the Pevensey High Street

- Location within East Sussex
- Area: 6.80 sq mi (17.6 km^{2})
- Population: 3,196 (2011)
  - Density: 464/sq mi (179/km^{2})
- OS grid reference: TQ635052
  - London: 50 mi (80 km) NNW
- District: Wealden
- Shire county: East Sussex
- Region: South East
- Country: England
- Sovereign state: United Kingdom
- Post town: PEVENSEY
- Postcode district: BN24
- Dialling code: 01323
- Police: Sussex
- Fire: East Sussex
- Ambulance: South East Coast
- UK Parliament: Bexhill and Battle
- Website: Parish Council

Pevensey (/ˈpɛvənzi/ PEV-ən-zee) is a village and civil parish in the Wealden district of East Sussex, England. The main village is located five miles (8 km) north-east of Eastbourne, one mile (1.6 km) inland from Pevensey Bay. The settlement of Pevensey Bay forms part of the parish. It was here that William the Conqueror made the landing in his invasion of England in 1066 after crossing the English Channel from Normandy.

== Geography ==
Pevensey is situated on a spur of sand and clay, about 33 feet (10 m) above sea level. In Roman times this spur was a peninsula that projected into a tidal lagoon and marshes. A small river, Pevensey Haven, runs along the north side of the peninsula and would originally have discharged into the lagoon, but is now largely silted up. The lagoon extended inland as far north as Hailsham and eastwards to Hooe. With the effect of longshore drift this large bay was gradually cut off from the sea by shingle, so that today's marshes are all that remain behind the shingle beach.

The marshes, known as the Pevensey Levels, cover an area of around 47 square miles (120 km^{2}). The marshes are a Site of Special Scientific Interest and a large nature reserve, jointly owned by Natural England and the Sussex Wildlife Trust. There are many nationally rare plants and invertebrates, including the fen raft spider. The site is very fragile and general access is not permitted.

Pevensey is also the start point of the 1066 Country Walk which is a long-distance footpath covering many historical sites in the area.

=== Pevensey Bay ===
The settlement of Pevensey Bay lies behind and on the shingle beach. Although small, it is nevertheless a seaside resort in miniature and has many of the facilities of its larger counterparts elsewhere. It is a clay bay, making it susceptible to erosion over time. The shingle beach at Pevensey Bay provides an important defence against flooding and storm damage from the sea for a large area of low-lying land beyond. There are two Martello towers, constructed in 1806 as Napoleonic coastal defences. Before development commenced it was known as Wallsend; the 16th century Castle Hotel standing alone on the beach.

== Name ==
The earliest evidence for the name Pevensey is in later copies of charters dated to 788 and 790, and the name occurs in a variety of forms, including Pefensea, Pæfensea and Pævenisel. The name means "River of [a man named] Pefen" and derives from the Anglo-Saxon personal name Pefen plus eã, "river", presumably a reference to the now largely silted-up Pevensey Haven. The spellings Pemse and Pemsey indicate the local pronunciation [pimzi], [pemzi].

== History ==
=== Roman fort ===
By the 4th century AD the south and east of the province of Britannia was under frequent attack from marauding barbarian tribes: including the Jutes and Saxons. To counter these attacks the Romans built a total of eleven forts between Essex and the Isle of Wight, now known as the Saxon Shore Forts. The fort at Pevensey, built between AD 300 and 340, was named Anderitum. The earliest stone remains on the site date from the Roman period, including the outer bailey wall. The sea washed over what is now Pevensey Marshes, surrounding the fort on three sides.

When the Roman army left Britain, the province was more vulnerable to attack, first by the Jutes in east Kent, and the Romanised native Britons attempted to defend their island from attack. Following the Jutish example the Saxons began invading Britain in earnest. Around 491, Saxons, possibly led by Ælle of Sussex began to colonise the south coast and besieged Anderitum over a number of years. After a long struggle the British defences were overrun. Some remaining Britons on the south coast fled north, others emigrated by boat to what is now called Brittany and the area became the Kingdom of the South Saxons, later called Sussex. The old Roman fort of Anderida was burned and left derelict. For a while the ruined castle was known by the Saxons as Andredceaster and the Weald of southern England – which stretches 120 miles (200 km) from Anderida to Dorset – was named Andredsweald, the Forest of Anderida.

The fort probably remained derelict until, in 1042, Harold Godwinson, later Harold II of England, established a stronghold here, improving fortifications by digging ditches within the walls of the fort. The English army remained at the fort during the summer of 1066 before abandoning it to meet the invading Norwegians further north.

When William the Conqueror invaded Sussex in September 1066 there were no defenders at Pevensey and the bay provided a safe haven for the invading fleet.

=== Castle ===
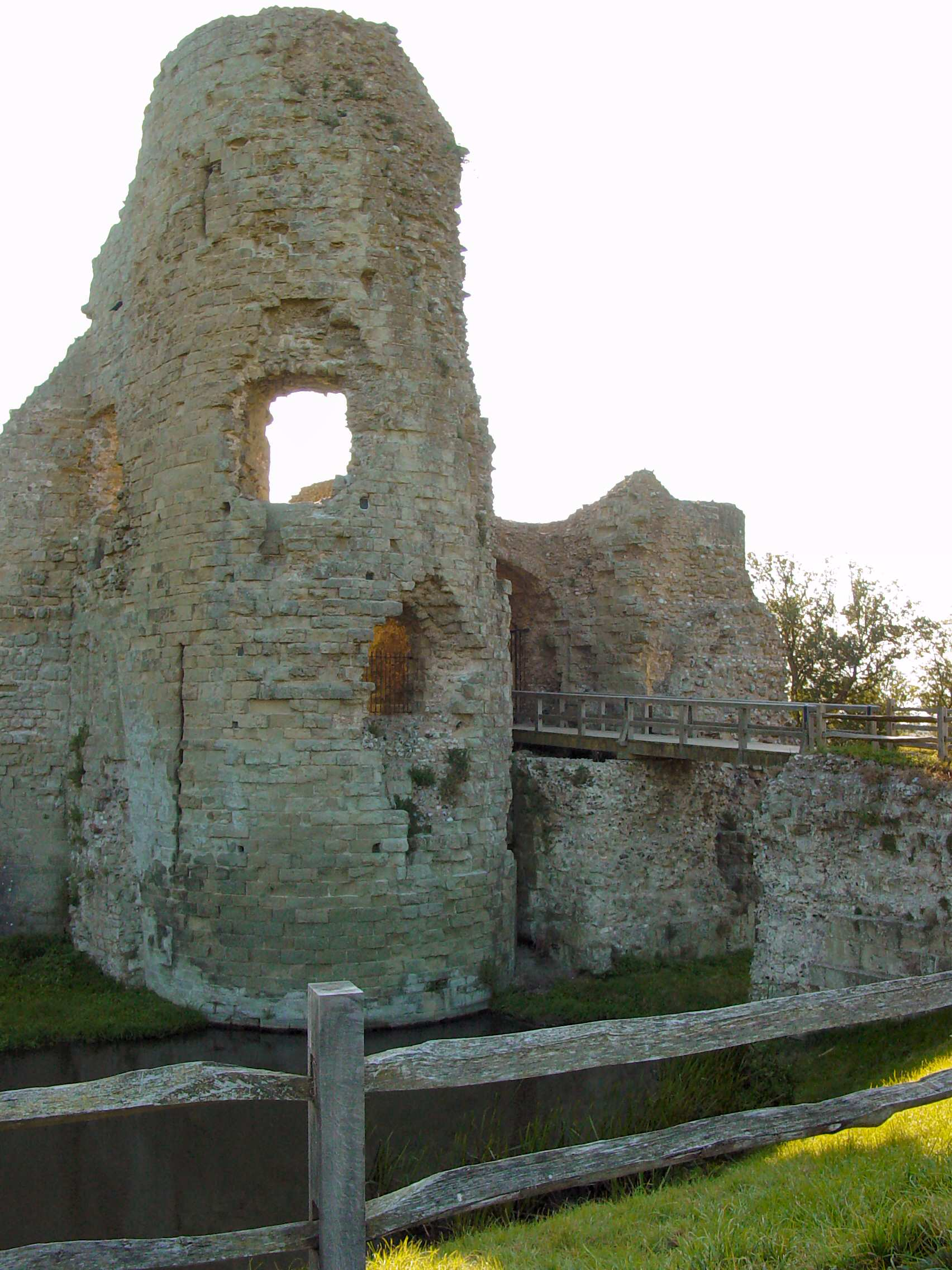
The remains of the 13th-century gatehouse of the inner bailey

In late 1066 the Roman fort at Pevensey was occupied by the Normans; much of the Roman stonework still existing today is due largely to the work of Robert, Count of Mortain (half brother to William), who was granted Pevensey Castle shortly after the Norman Conquest. Robert de Mortain used the remains as the base for building his castle, carrying out only minor repairs to the walls forming the outer bailey, and building a new inner bailey at the eastern end.

At the time of the Domesday survey of 1086, Pevensey was a significant settlement of 110 households and a mill.

The castle was besieged several times during the 11th–13th centuries. An order by Queen Elizabeth I that it be demolished and an attempt at demolition during the Puritan times were both unsuccessful: the order was ignored and only a few stones were removed on the two occasions. As late as 1942 small additions were made to the castle for the defence of Britain, when it was used to spot German aircraft during World War II.

Today the castle is in the upkeep of English Heritage.

=== Liberty of Pevensey ===
The Liberty (or Lowey) of Pevensey was an ancient now obsolete hundred, containing the parishes of Westham and Pevensey. They were entirely within the Levels and together regarded as constituting part of the port of Hastings, and consequently would be entitled to all the privileges and immunities enjoyed by the Cinque Ports and not part of the county of Sussex jurisdiction. This would have been the case until the system of hundreds as administration divisions was abandoned in the 19th century.

=== Other historic events ===
In the 16th century Pevensey became what was known as a "non-corporate limb" of the Hastings, as part of the Confederation of the Cinque Ports. Along with most of the other Ports, its importance dwindled as the ports themselves became disconnected from the sea: Pevensey was two miles (3.2 km) distant.

During the 18th and 19th centuries Pevensey Bay became involved in the south coast smuggling trade, since it was one of the easier places to land the contraband. In 1833 a violent clash occurred between the smugglers and customs men at Pevensey Bay.

Some of the more than 100 Martello towers were erected along the beaches of Pevensey Bay at the beginning of the 19th century to guard against Napoleonic attack.

== Governance ==
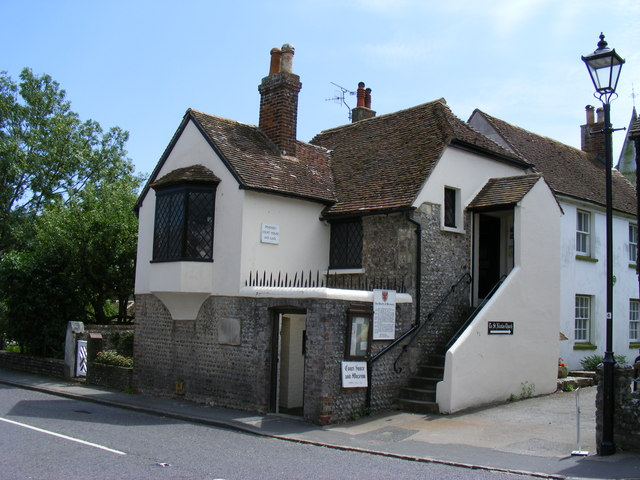
Pevensey Court House

In 1207 the town was granted a royal charter by King John and was governed by Pevensey Corporation. With the decline in the town's importance by the 19th century, the Corporation was eventually dissolved in 1886 and the town lost its borough status. The records of the Corporation are held in the East Sussex Record Office at Brighton, and a voluntary body, the Pevensey Town Trust, was formed to manage the property which had formerly belonged to the Corporation, most notably Pevensey Court House.

Pevensey is now a village, with a parish council consisting of twelve elected councillors. Three councillors are elected to the Wealden District Council to represent Pevensey; the Member of Parliament is Kieran Mullan, who represents the Bexhill and Battle Constituency, of which Pevensey is part. Pevensey is also part of the electoral ward called Pevensey and Westham. The population of this ward at the 2011 Census was 9,467.

== Religious buildings ==
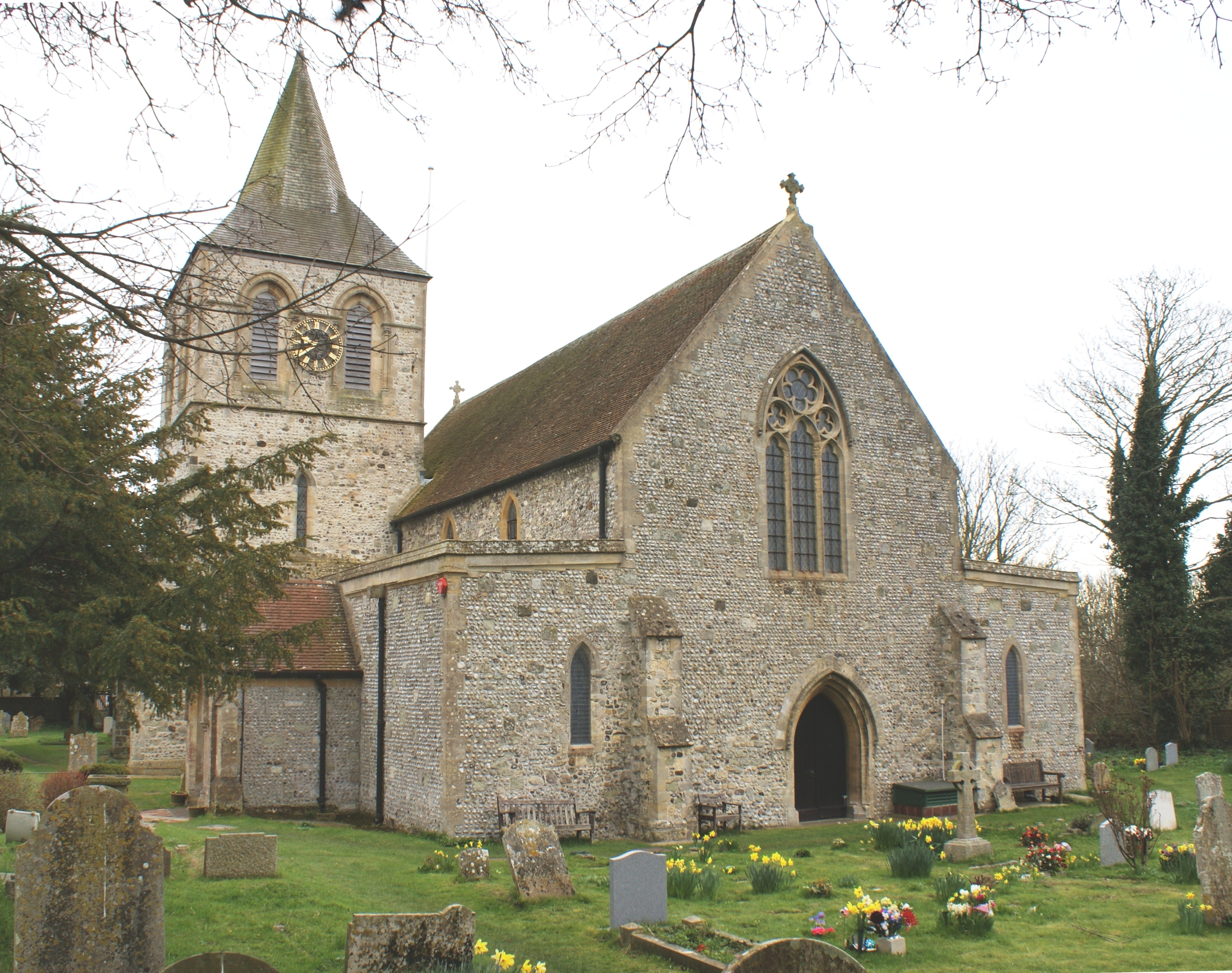
Early English St. Nicolas Church, the Anglican parish church of Pevensey.

Within the parish are the Anglican parish church dedicated to St Nicolas; St Wilfrid's church, Pevensey Bay; the Wesleyan Methodist church, the Pevensey Bay Free Church, and Holy Rood Catholic church, Pevensey Bay.

== Historic buildings ==
Pevensey has 23 buildings of historic significance listed by English Heritage including the Grade I listed St Nicolas church and the Grade II* listed Old Mint House. In 2022 the Old Mint House was added to English Heritage's list of buildings at risk of disrepair.

== Transport ==
The A259 road passes through Pevensey. Two railway stations serve the area: Pevensey and Westham and Pevensey Bay.

== Culture ==
=== Pevensey in the arts ===
- J. M. W. Turner painted Pevensey Castle.
- Pevensey features several times in Rudyard Kipling's Puck of Pook's Hill (1907). Kipling's characters describe it as "England's Gate", the reason for this being the above history. Kipling lived near to Pevensey at Burwash, and the area is described in his autobiography.
- The fall of Anderitum, now Pevensey, in the final years of Roman occupation features in the 1875 novel Anderida: or the Briton and the Saxon, A. D. CCCCXLI by Thomas Burnside Crowther. He drew on the account in Edward Gibbon's The History of the Decline and Fall of the Roman Empire.
- Pevensey features in The Saxon Shore (1983), a book of photographs by photographer Fay Godwin.
- Pevensey is the setting for parts of George Gissing's 1887 novel Thyrza, with an especially fine description in Chapter XLI, "The Living".
- Robert Sheldon composed Pevensey Castle, published by C.L. Barnhouse in 1993.
- Pevensey, and in particular Pevensey Bay, feature in the 1946 crime novel Uneasy Terms by best selling author Peter Cheyney. In Chapter 7 the hero, a private detective called Slim Callaghan, goes for a ride out on Pevensey Bay with the alluring murder suspect, Corinne Alardyse.
- Pevensey Bay was the landing place of Gibreel Farishta and Saladin Chamcha in Salman Rushdie's The Satanic Verses.
- Pevensey was mentioned in the memoirs of comedian Spike Milligan. Based at nearby Bexhill, Pevensey’s Martello Tower was one of three Observation Posts to which Milligan and his fellow signallers were assigned during the Second World War and featured in Milligan's book Adolf Hitler: My Part in His Downfall. According to Milligan, it was preferred to the other two: ‘’Most of us tried for the Martello on Pevensey Beach as the local birds were easier to lay, but you had to be quick because of the tides.’’ Milligan does not clarify which of the three towers in Pevensey was used.

== Sport ==
Pevensey Bay Sailing Club offers a variety of classes of boats: the club played a leading role in the development of the National 12 and Merlin Rocket Development Class racing dinghies in the 1970s when it was the home club of Phil Morrison, the British yacht designer and father of Stevie Morrison, a British Olympic 49er sailor in the 2008 games. The village also has a village cricket team.
