= Iford, East Sussex =

Village and parish in East Sussex, England

Coordinates: 50.85°N 0.01°W

Iford
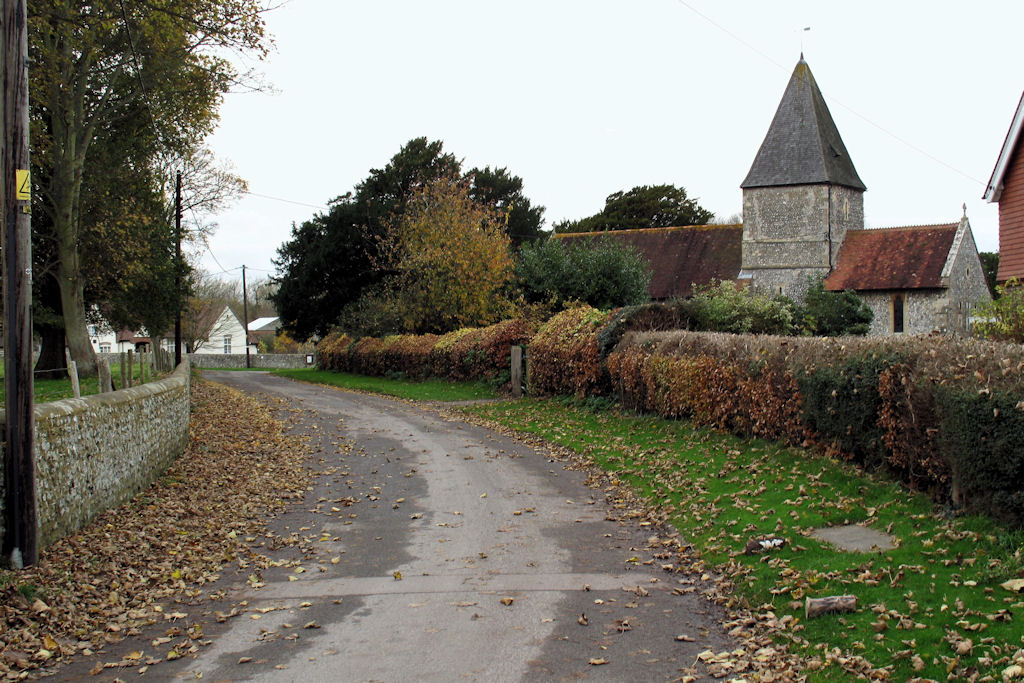
- View of village and church

- Location within East Sussex
- Area: 9.7 km^{2} (3.7 sq mi)
- Population: 205 (2007); 209 (2011 Census)
  - Density: 55/sq mi (21/km^{2})
- OS grid reference: TQ405072
  - London: 45 miles (72 km) N
- District: Lewes
- Shire county: East Sussex
- Region: South East
- Country: England
- Sovereign state: United Kingdom
- Post town: LEWES
- Postcode district: BN7
- Dialling code: 01273
- Police: Sussex
- Fire: East Sussex
- Ambulance: South East Coast
- UK Parliament: Lewes

Iford /ˈaɪfərd/ is a village and civil parish in the Lewes District of East Sussex, England. The village is located two miles (3.2 km) south of Lewes. The parish lies on the slopes of the South Downs in the valley of the River Ouse.

== Notable buildings ==
Notable areas around Iford

Iford parish sits to the north of Rodmell and to the south of Kingston near Lewes. To the east (and on the other side of the River Ouse) is the Glynde parish and to the far west, over the South Downs, is Brighton and Hove.

The parish has many notable buildings. Indeed, it has eighteen listed structures in Iford, including Sutton House of circa 1800. The Greenwich meridian runs through the village which is marked by a sundial, provided for by a Millennium Commission Lottery Fund grant.

=== St Nicholas Church ===
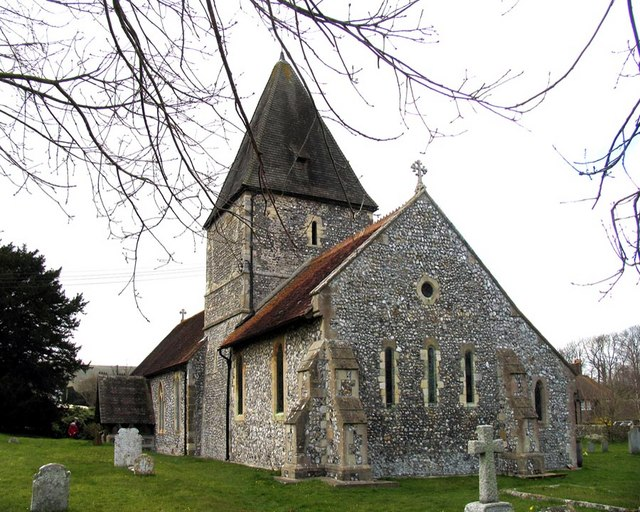
St Nicholas, Iford

The parish church of St Nicholas is a Norman church and dates from the 12th century, although much was restored in the 19th century. It has an unusual arrangement of nave and chancel separated by the tower, possibly formerly at the crossing, though transepts and a north aisle have been demolished. It is a Grade I listed building.

=== Iford Manor ===
Iford Manor is a neo-gothic house built in 1830 by Henry Burley. It is three storeys with three gables and a tiled roof. It is a Grade II listed building.

=== Swanborough Manor ===
Swanborough Manor is also a Grade I listed building. It incorporates fabrics which date back to 1200 from the Grange of St Pancras, a dependency of St Pancras Priory, Lewes.

== Notable areas ==
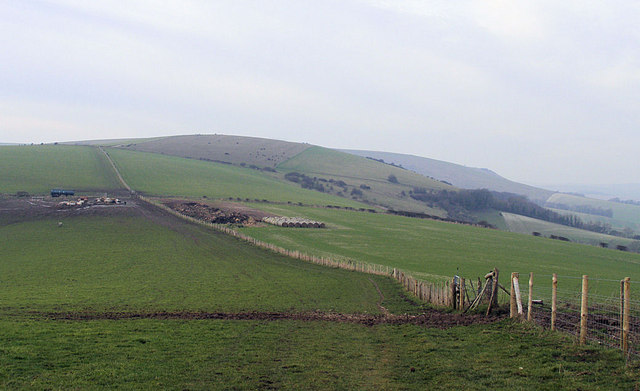
Front Hill, Iford Hill and Swanborough Hill

Iford Estate, which is 1,200 hectares (3,000 acres), owns most of the surrounding area around Iford. It lies within the South Downs National Park and comprises Iford Farm, Swanborough Farm, Rise Farm to the southeast of Lewes and Houndean Farm to the northwest. The estate is heavily diversified. Its principle enterprises are still the production of cereals and beef, but it also has a range of properties and leisure facilities, which includes shooting, fishing lakes, light aircraft and luxury accommodation. The Estate claims to be environmentally friendly. Nearby is Northease Farm.

Lewes Brooks sits to the east of the village. It is of biological importance and part of the flood plain of the River Ouse. It provides a habitat for many other invertebrates such as water beetles and snails.

The Downs to the west of Iford are impressive. It is the most treeless part of our Downs without the deep-cut bostals (tracks) visible in other parts, as medieval traders and herders descended these slopes comparatively rarely. At the top of the scarp in this area are three hills: Front Hill, Iford Hill and Swanborough Hill. Across the ridge is the line of the South Downs Way.Unfortunately despite passing close to the designated Iford Hill slopes, it does not actually pass ancient Downland pasture, nor does it benefit from the flowers and wildlife that survive off it. Three ancient barrow clusters have also been lost to the plough on Front Hill.

=== Lewes Brooks ===
Located to the east of Iford village, Lewes Brooks, known locally as the Vale of the Brooks, works as a flood plain of the River Ouse between Lewes and Southease. The Brooks support a wide diversity of invertebrates, with water beetles (Coleoptera) being particularly well represented. There are also several rare snails (Mollusca), flies (Diptera) and moths (Lepidoptera). The brooks at Iford are less biodiverse than the brooks in the surrounding parishes due to the intensive farming they have sustained in the last fifty years. The Sussex Ouse Valley Way, a track between Lower Beeding in West Sussex and the sea at Seaford in East Sussex, runs along the eastern most boundary of the parish along the west bank of the Ouse and the eastern edge of the brooks.

=== Swanborough Hill ===
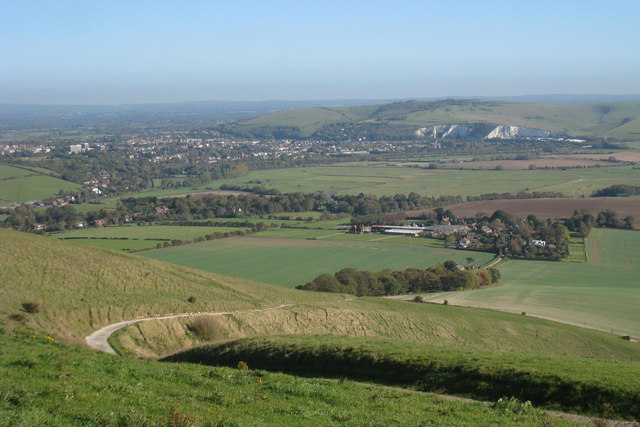
Track to Swanborough Manor

Swanborough Hill (TQ 390 070) is the northern most peak of the parish and borders Kingston near Lewes. The hill itself was not named after swans. The name came from the Saxon ‘swan’, as in ‘swain’ and so its origin is not the ‘swan’s hill’, but the ‘herdsman’s hill’. It once had a barrow field, including a cluster of small Saxon tumps, but it has been intensively farmed since the war, ploughed and sprayed with agro-chemicals. The tumps and ancient vegetation are now gone. In summer, now, the ragwort has taken hold, sometimes in dense patches.

=== Iford Hill ===
Between Swanborough and Front Hill is Iford Hill. The slopes of Iford Hill are part of a designated Site of Special Scientific Interest. The north west is in good condition and the calcareous grassland supports a good variety of species. However surveys have indicated that the east side has scrub encroachment with uniform gorse and a lot of ragwort.

=== Front Hill ===
Front Hill is at the southern most peak of the parish and borders Southease. The south slopes of Front Hill (TQ 402 056) have retained a Down pasture. Unfortunately, it lies one thousand metres to the south of South Downs Way and this area of natural beauty is missed by the majority of walkers. However, it is sun-soaked and south facing Access land and in July the turf can be spangled pyramidal orchids, rampion and harebells. The two parts of the site are grazed and well-managed although the unremitting grazing of the northern half does not allow for flower displays.

=== Home, Long and Whiteway Bottom ===
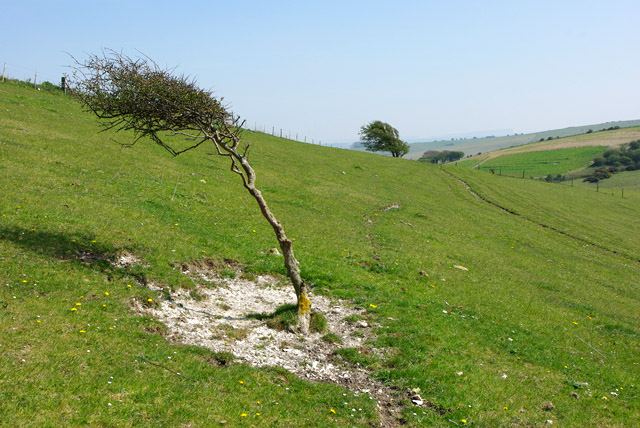
Hawthorn bush, Home Bottom

Behind the peaks of Front, Iford and Southease Hill the parish continues west. There are three valleys, Home Bottom, Long Bottom and Whiteway Bottom. From the slopes of Long Bottom (TQ 389 060) southwards you look across long ripples of hills, like the sea, and the cliffs of Seaford Head are where the view ends. There are tumps that could be barrows. The area can support bee and spotted orchids some years with sky blue chalk milkwort and rockrose with adonis blue butterfly and yellow belle moth.

A path climbs up Whiteway Bottom to Pickers Hill and on the top there was a barrow field. It is ploughed out now. When the sun is low you can see bold prehistoric field lynchets at the head of the Whiteway combe (TQ 391 052), and back towards Highdole in the Rodmell parish, as well as up the dean around Long Bottom. The south slope of Whiteway Bottom (TQ 396 054) is a tranquil old Down pasture site. It was damaged by agro-chemicals at its western end, but the middle and eastern end are intact, with lots of butterflies, including small heath, chalkhill blue, common blue and marbled white, and lots of old Down pasture herbs.

Whiteway Bottom turns up the dean, where it used to be called Isenden, and splits into three combes. The first of these used to be called Short Bottom and is now Killal (TQ 390 057). There are cowslips and devil's-bit flower and common blue butterflies. A little copse has been planted and there are boney lynchets. It was a neglected place, but now it is grazed and well-managed.

=== Pickers Hill ===
A path from Balsdean and Whiteway Bottom runs up from the south to Pickers Hill. From Southease Hill, to the northwest, a ridge track takes you on to the Hill too. There is public footpath that runs southwest along the Pickers Hill ridge. On either side of you are seemingly endless agricultural fields, but to the south are views of the sea.

=== Balsdean Bottom ===
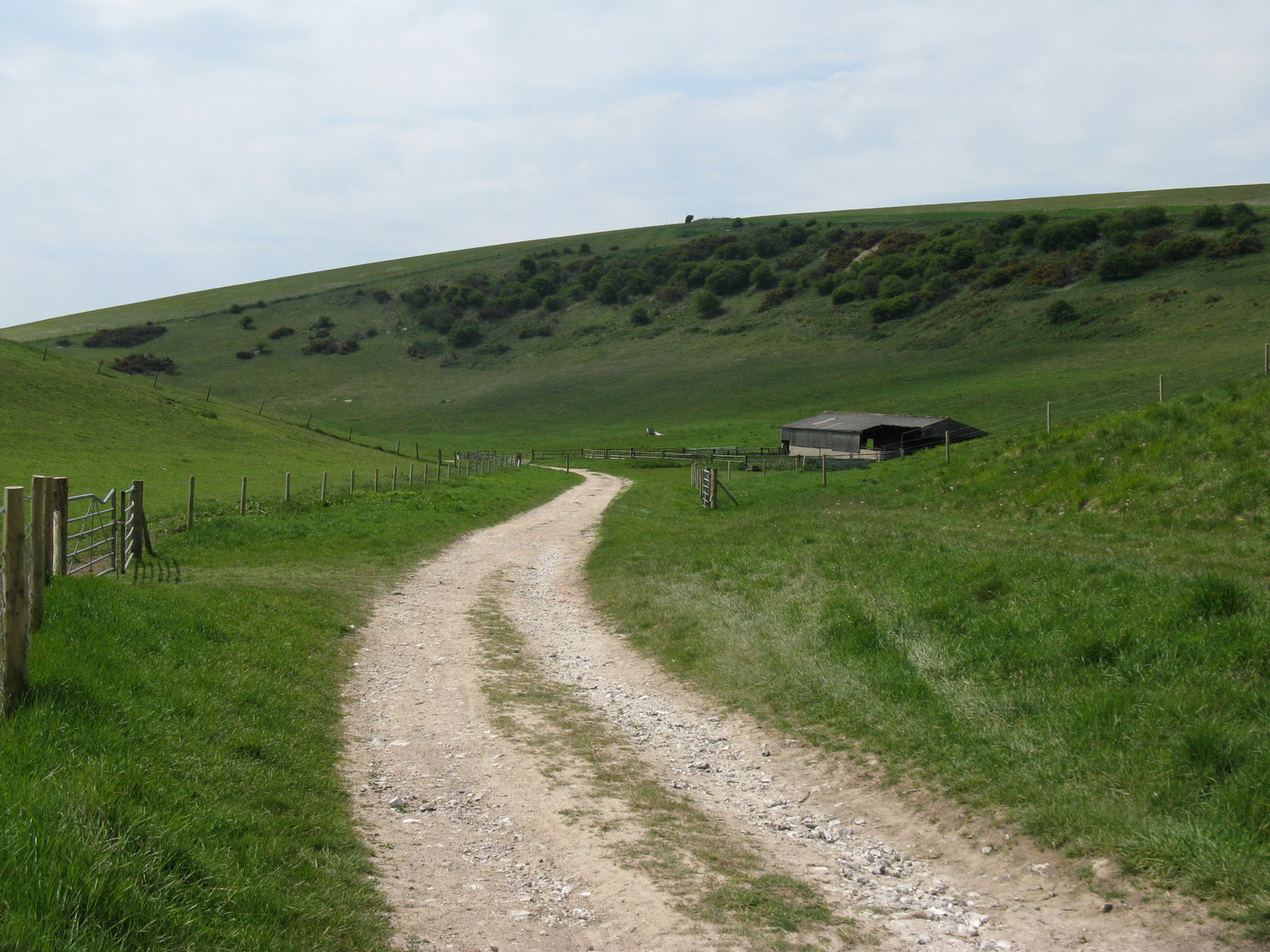
Farm buildings in Balsdean Bottom

Above Balsdean Bottom (TQ 385 065) there is a game bird release pen on the northwest end. They breed the now rare grey partridge which makes it more acceptable to walkers. Its slopes were ploughed during the 20th century and received agrochemicals unlike the treasured and protected valleys at Castle Hill, which lie to the west of Balsdean. Gladly, there are signs of a change as new agro-environmental support systems kick in.

The valleyside east of Balsdean (TQ 382 058), has a scallop-shaped site on its steepest part which retains its aboriginal vegetation, but it has had no grazing for many years and so has become overgrown with tor grass and encroaching thorn. Below its lower fence line, a fragment of old turf is well-grazed by a Brighton tenant farmer. Where the sheep can go, the flowers follow and horseshoe vetch, fragrant and spotted orchids and powder-blue chalk milkwort thrive here.

== Governance ==
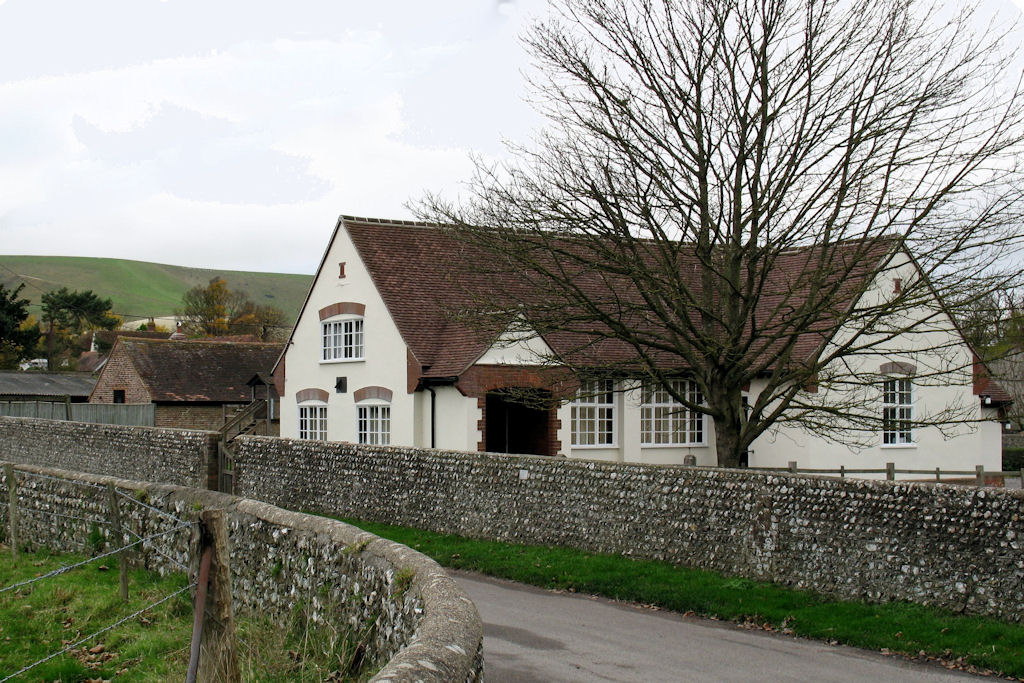
Iford Hall with a meridian sundial

On a local level, Iford parish is governed as a Parish meeting with meetings held in Iford Hall built in 1931 in memory of Audrey Robinson.

The next level of government is the district council. The parish of Iford lies within the Kingston ward of Lewes District Council, which returns a single seat to the council. The election on 4 May 2007 elected a Liberal Democrat

East Sussex County Council is the next tier of government, for which Iford is within the Newhaven and Ouse Valley West division, with responsibility for Education, Libraries, Social Services, Civil Registration, Trading Standards and Transport. Elections for the County Council are held every four years. The Conservative Keith Glazier was elected in the 2017 election.

The UK Parliament constituency for Iford is Lewes. The Liberal Democrat Norman Baker served as the constituency MP from 1997 until 2015, when Conservative Maria Caulfield was elected. As of July 2024 Liberal Democrat James MacCleary is the MP.

Prior to Brexit in 2020, the village was part of the South East England constituency in the European Parliament.
