= Marland Sewer =

River and drainage ditch in East Sussex, England

Coordinates: 50.8411°N 0.2795°E

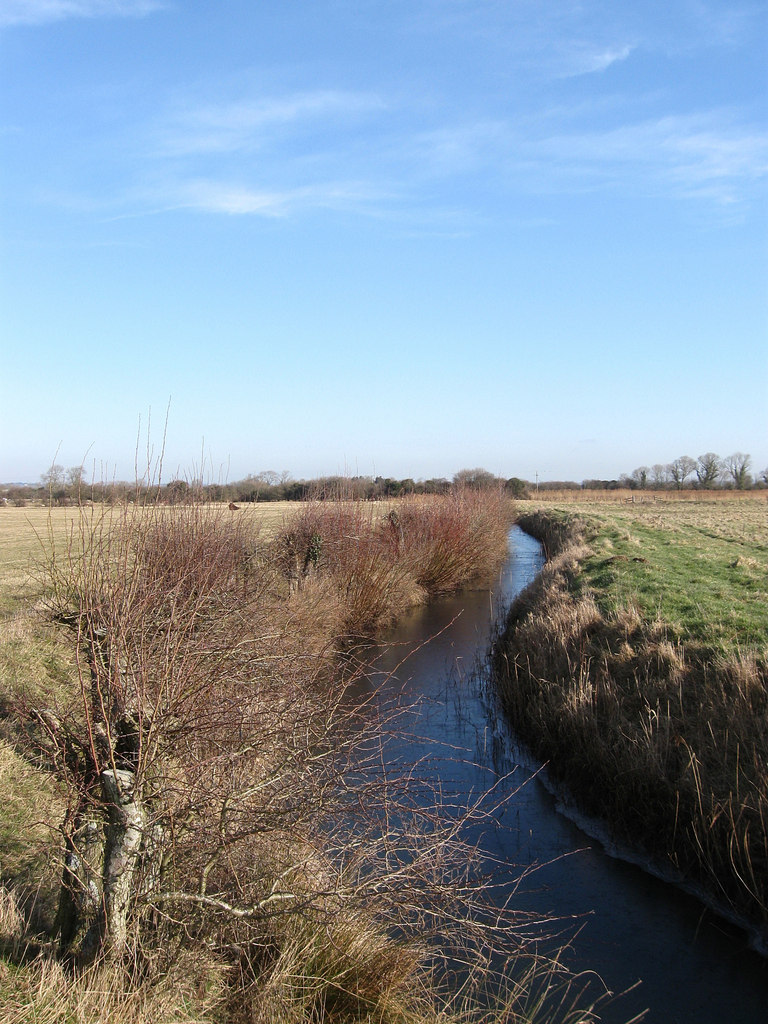
Marland Sewer

Marland Sewer is a minor, 767-metre (2,516 ft) long river (brook) and drainage ditch in the Pevensey Levels of Hailsham, Wealden District, East Sussex, England. Rising from Winters Cut, Marland Sewer drains water in farmland north of the A27 road, and forms multiple tributary streams. It gives rise to Glynleigh Sewer, itself a tributary of Pevensey Haven. One pumping station moves a culvert stream into Marland Sewer.
