= Westham =

Village in East Sussex, England

Coordinates: 50.82°N 0.32°E

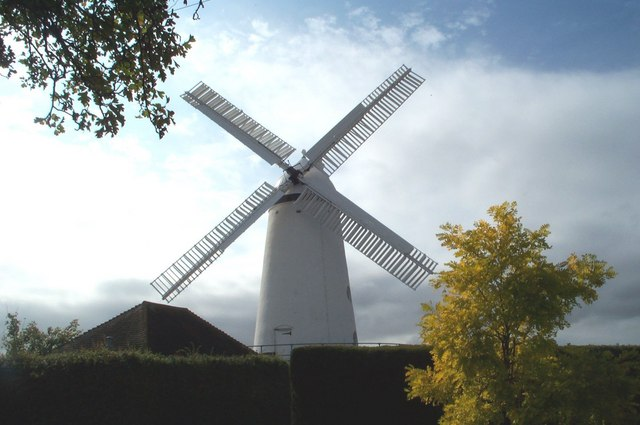
- Stone Cross Windmill

- Location within East Sussex
- Area: 14.2 km^{2} (5.5 sq mi)
- Population: 6,314 (Parish-2011)
  - Density: 1,067/sq mi (412/km^{2})
- OS grid reference: TQ637045
  - London: 51 miles (82 km) NNW
- District: Wealden
- Shire county: East Sussex
- Region: South East
- Country: England
- Sovereign state: United Kingdom
- Post town: PEVENSEY
- Postcode district: BN24
- Dialling code: 01323
- Police: Sussex
- Fire: East Sussex
- Ambulance: South East Coast
- UK Parliament: Bexhill and Battle, Lewes
- Website: Parish Council

Westham is a large village and civil parish in the Wealden District of East Sussex, England. The village is adjacent to Pevensey five miles (8 km) north-east of Eastbourne. The parish consists of three settlements: Westham; Stone Cross; and Hankham. The parish is virtually part of the Greater Eastbourne conurbation, and much expansion has been occurring here: hence the large population.

== History ==
Although overshadowed by its close neighbour, Pevensey, Westham is recorded in the Domesday Book of 1086. Its name derives from being a hamlet to the west of Pevensey Castle.

== Governance ==
The parish council has thirteen elected members.

== Geography ==
The parish lies along a ridge at the western end of the Pevensey Levels, the area once an inlet of the sea. The main village centre, Westham, is at the eastern end of the parish, and is virtually coterminous with Pevensey village.

== Landmarks ==
Stone Cross is the home to a windmill which is located on high ground in the village. This tower mill was built between 1875 and 1876, the last of the type built in Sussex. Although ceasing commercial operation in 1937, it has since been refurbished and is open to the public. It is a Grade II* listed building.

Pevensey Levels, a Site of Special Scientific Interest, lies partially in the parish. The site is of biological interest consisting of low-lying grazing meadows, hosting a wide variety of wetland flora and fauna.

== Transport ==
The village is served by Pevensey and Westham railway station on the East Coastway Line. The A27 trunk road crosses the parish from west to east.

== Education ==
There are three primary schools serving the parish: Pevensey and Westham School; Hankham County Primary School; and Stone Cross School.

== Religious sites ==
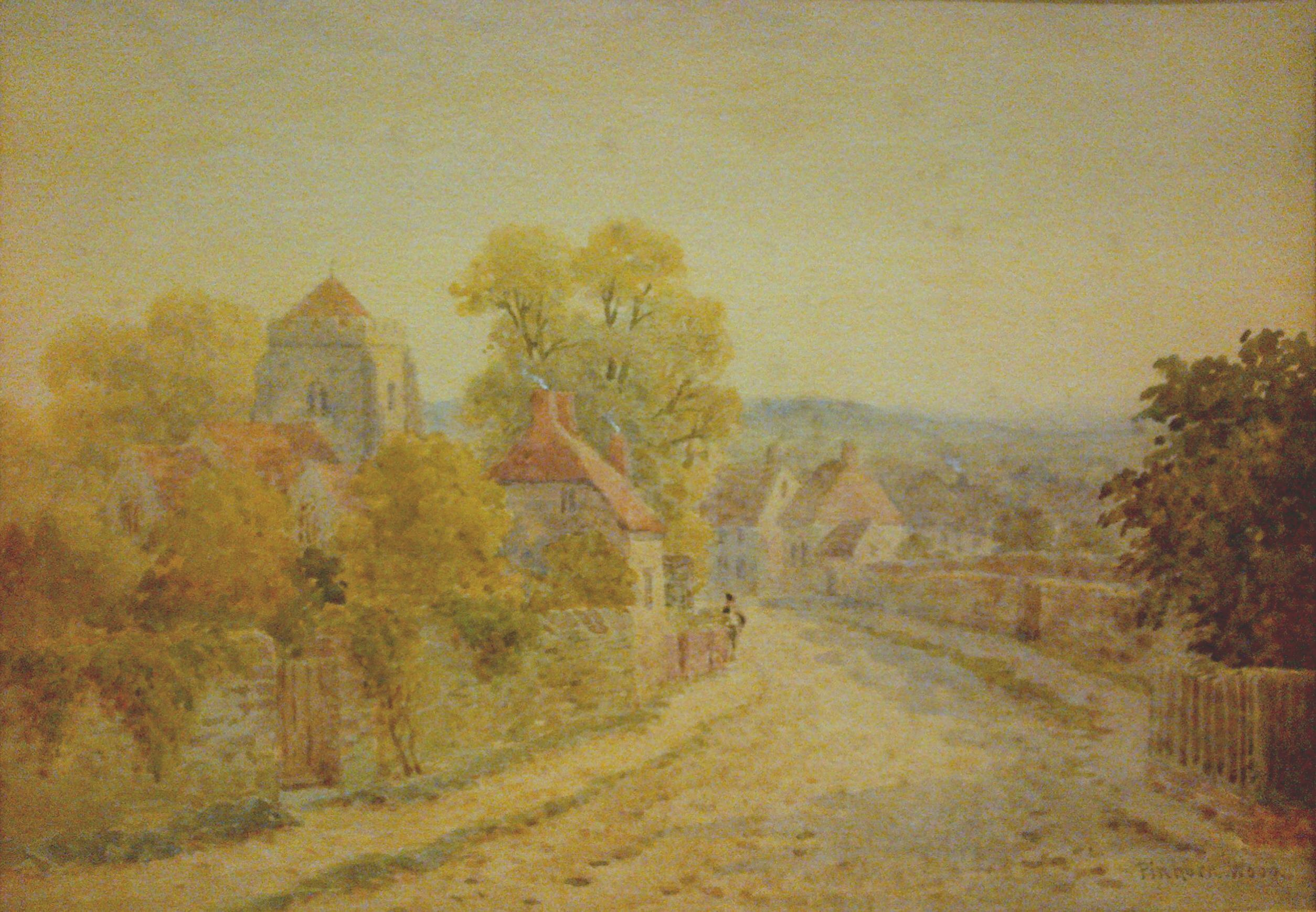
‘Westham Church from Pevensey Castle looking west’ by Lewis Pinhorn Wood

There are two churches in the civil parish.

The 11th-century St Mary's church at Westham is reputed to be the first Norman church in England, although the church at Bramber also claims that title. St Mary's is depicted in a number of paintings by the Victorian landscapist Lewis Pinhorn Wood (1848–1918), including 'Westham Church from Pevensey Castle looking West'.

St Luke's parish church at Stone Cross (also serving the settlement of North Langney) is a more recent building of 1926; it stands at a crossroads near the windmill. The church fell into disrepair during the 1970s and was refurbished and re-opened in 1988. The church hall is a recent addition to the church and was built in 2003. To the front of the church is the war memorial with the names of local people who lost their life during two world wars, whose names are read out during each Remembrance Sunday service.

== Notable people ==
Ian Gow (1937–90), politician, was assassinated at his home in Hankham by an IRA bomb.
