= Puckeridge Stream =

River in East Sussex, England

Coordinates: 50.8640°N 0.3130°E

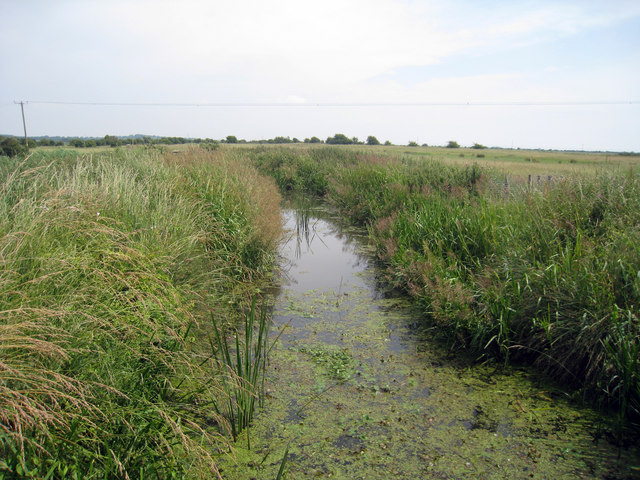
Puckeridge Stream near its confluence with Hurst Haven, looking east

Puckeridge Stream is a minor river (brook) and drainage ditch of the Pevensey Levels in Hailsham, Wealden District of East Sussex, England. The river is a tributary to Hurst Haven, itself a tributary of Pevensey Haven. Puckeridge Stream has multiple tributaries itself, including Magham Sewer and Bowley Sewer.

== Course ==
Puckeridge Stream rises in Magham Down and flows southeasterly for the entirely of its course, receiving the waters of several streams and ditches and forming numerous tributaries, most unnamed. After receiving the waters of Bowley Sewer, Puckeridge Stream turns easterly, then receiving the waters of Magham Sewer via a culvert underneath an undesignated farm road, before finally flowing into Hurst Haven.
