= Bowley Sewer =

River in East Sussex, England

Coordinates: 50.8659°N 0.3106°E

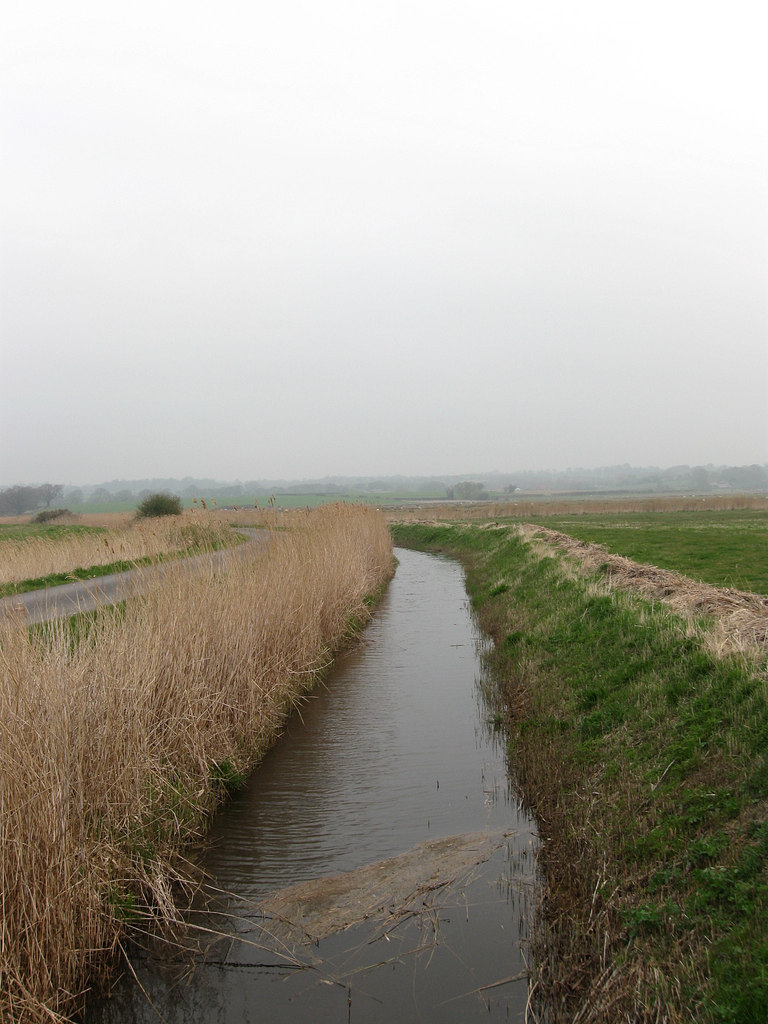
Bowley Sewer, looking north

Bowley Sewer is a minor, 1.8-kilometre (1.1 mi) long river (brook) and drainage ditch of the Pevensey Levels in Hailsham, Wealden District of East Sussex, England. It is a tributary of Puckeridge Stream, which itself is a tributary of Hurst Haven.

== Course ==
Located entirely in the civil parish of Hailsham, Bowley Sewer rises in farmland east of Magham Down and flows southerly before turning easterly. After flowing underneath an undesignated road via a culvert, Bowley Sewer resumes its southerly course, receiving the waters of Sackville Sewer before finally flowing into Puckeridge Stream.
