= Crossing Sewer =

River in East Sussex, England

Coordinates: 50.8464°N 0.2870°E

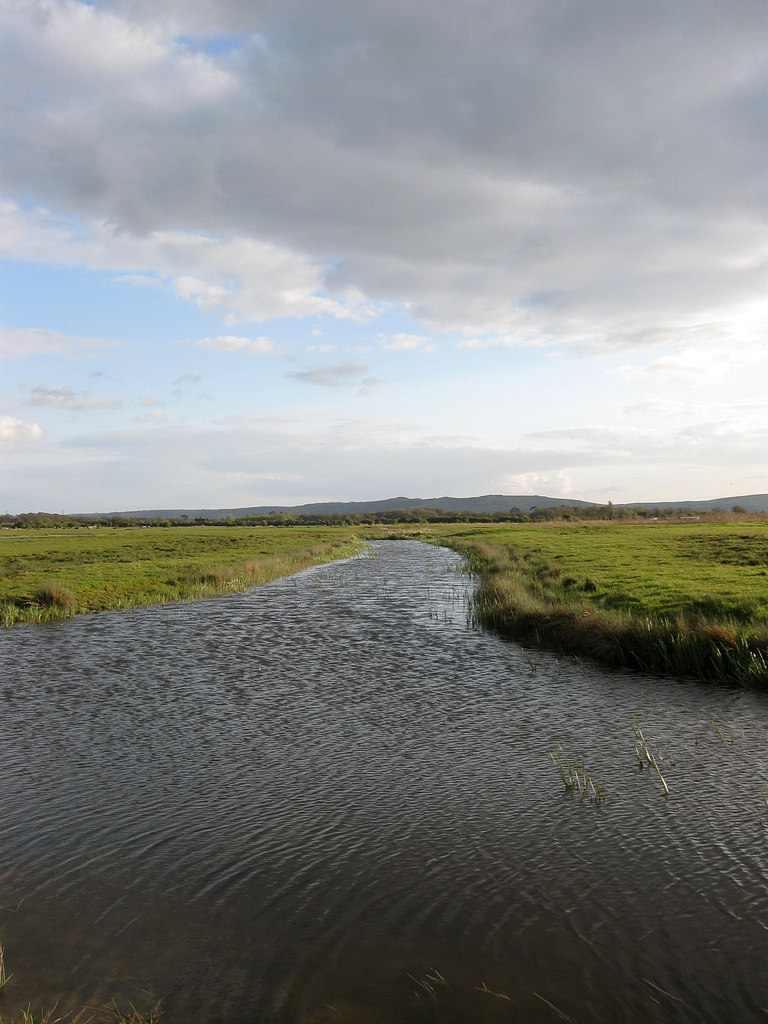
Picture of the 1.8-kilometre (1.1 mi) long stream, looking south

Crossing Sewer is the name of two minor streams (brooks) of the Pevensey Levels in Hailsham, Wealden District of East Sussex, England. Both streams serve as drainage ditches for several streams, many of which are unnamed.

== Course ==
The first 776-metre (2,546 ft) long river bearing the name rises from Horse Eye Sewer and flows southwesterly. It then turns southeast and flows into White Dyke Sewer, giving rise to Lewens Sewer. The second stream, 1.8-kilometre (1.1 mi) long, comprises two ditches both rising from Rickney Sewer that eventually meet. The single drainage ditch of Crossing Sewer then drains back into White Dyke Sewer, which itself is a tributary of Down Sewer.
