= Magham Sewer =

River in East Sussex, England

Coordinates: 50.8651°N 0.3102°E

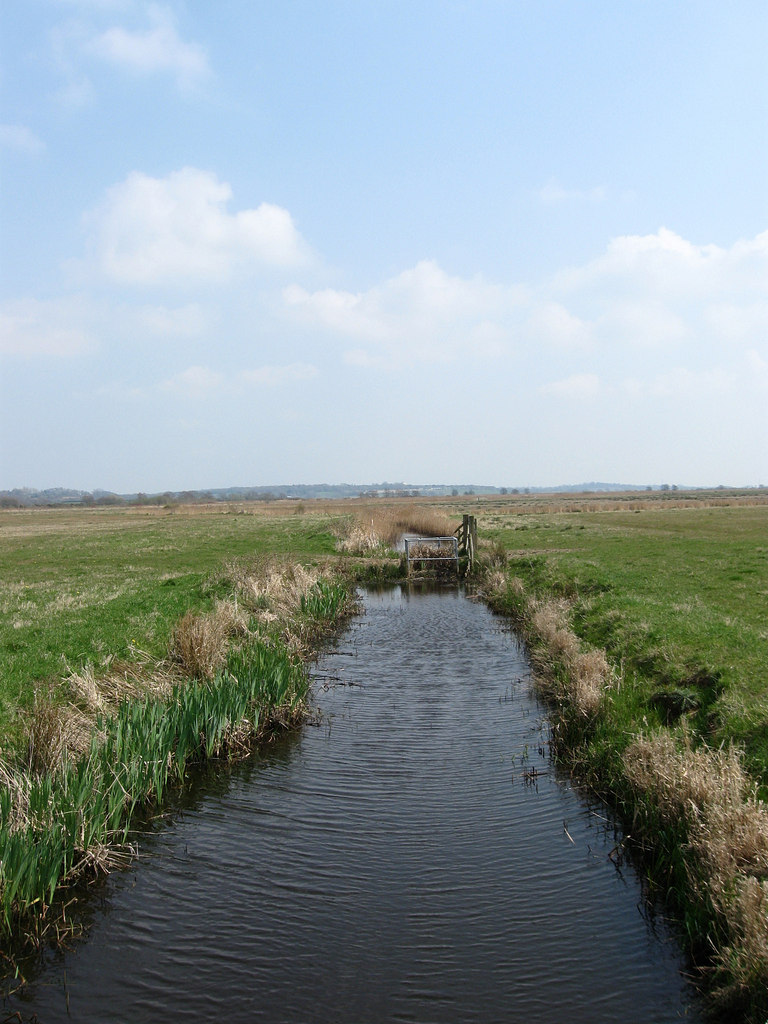
Magham Sewer, looking east

Magham Sewer is a minor, 2.2-kilometre (1.4 mi) long river (brook) and drainage ditch of the Pevensey Levels in the civil parish of Hailsham, Wealden District of East Sussex, England, that is a tributary of Puckeridge Stream. The river acts as a drainage basin for several smaller ditches, including streams from Puckeridge Stream.

== Course ==
Located entirely in the civil parish of Hailsham, Magham Sewer rises in south Magham Down just east of the village of Hailsham, and flows easterly. After about 1-kilometre (0.62 mi), it turns southeasterly for another 1.2-kilometre (0.75 mi) before finally flowing into Puckeridge Stream underneath an undesignated farm road via a culvert.
