= Kentland Sewer =

River in East Sussex, England

Kentland Sewer is a minor, 3.4 kilometres (2.1 mi) long river—brook—and drainage ditch of the Pevensey Levels in Hailsham, Wealden District of East Sussex, England. It gives rise to, and receives the waters of, several streams and ditches—most unnamed.

== Course ==
Kentland Sewer rises from an unnamed stream just north of Railland Ditch and east of Hurst Haven, flowing northerly. After giving rise to Kentland Fleet, the river briefly turns northwesterly before resuming its northerly course. It then receives the waters of Curteis Ditch and flows easterly for 694 metres (2,277 ft). After receiving the waters of Church Farm Ditch, Kentland Sewer flows southeasterly—receiving the waters of Kentland Fleet and giving rise to Sew Ditch—for 1.5 kilometres (0.93 mi), before finally ending at Manxey Pumping Station in Old Marsh Foot Farm.
