= Lewens Sewer =

River in East Sussex, England

Coordinates: 50.8505°N 0.2923°E

Lewens Sewer

Lewens Sewer is a minor, 1.1-kilometre (0.68 mi) long stream (brook) and drainage ditch of the Pevensey Levels in Hailsham, Wealden District of East Sussex, England, that is a tributary to Horse Eye Sewer. Flowing northeasterly throughout its entire course, Lewens Sewer rises at the confluence of Crossing Sewer and White Dyke Sewer near the White Dyke Marsh marshland. It has two left tributaries that drain water from an unnamed ditch draining Horse Eye Sewer, and two right tributaries that direct water into White Dyke Sewer.
