= Francis Pryor =

English archaeologist and sheep farmer

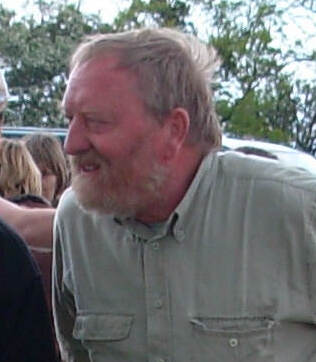
- Pryor in 2007
- Born: Francis Manning Marlborough Pryor; 13 January 1945 (age 80)
- Education: Eton College
- Alma mater: Trinity College, Cambridge
- Occupation(s): Archaeologist, Prehistorian
- Known for: Flag Fen, Time Team
- Spouse: Maisie Taylor
- Children: 1

Francis Manning Marlborough Pryor MBE FSA (born 13 January 1945) is an English archaeologist specialising in the study of the Bronze and Iron Ages in Britain. He is best known for his discovery and excavation of Flag Fen, a Bronze Age archaeological site near Peterborough, as well as for his frequent appearances on the Channel 4 television series Time Team.

Born to a Burke's Landed Gentry family, Pryor attended Eton College before going on to study archaeology at Trinity College, Cambridge. With his first wife, Sylvia Page, he moved to Canada, where he worked as a technician at the Royal Ontario Museum for a year before returning to Britain.

He has now retired from full-time field archaeology but still appears on television and writes books as well as being a working sheep farmer.

== Biography ==
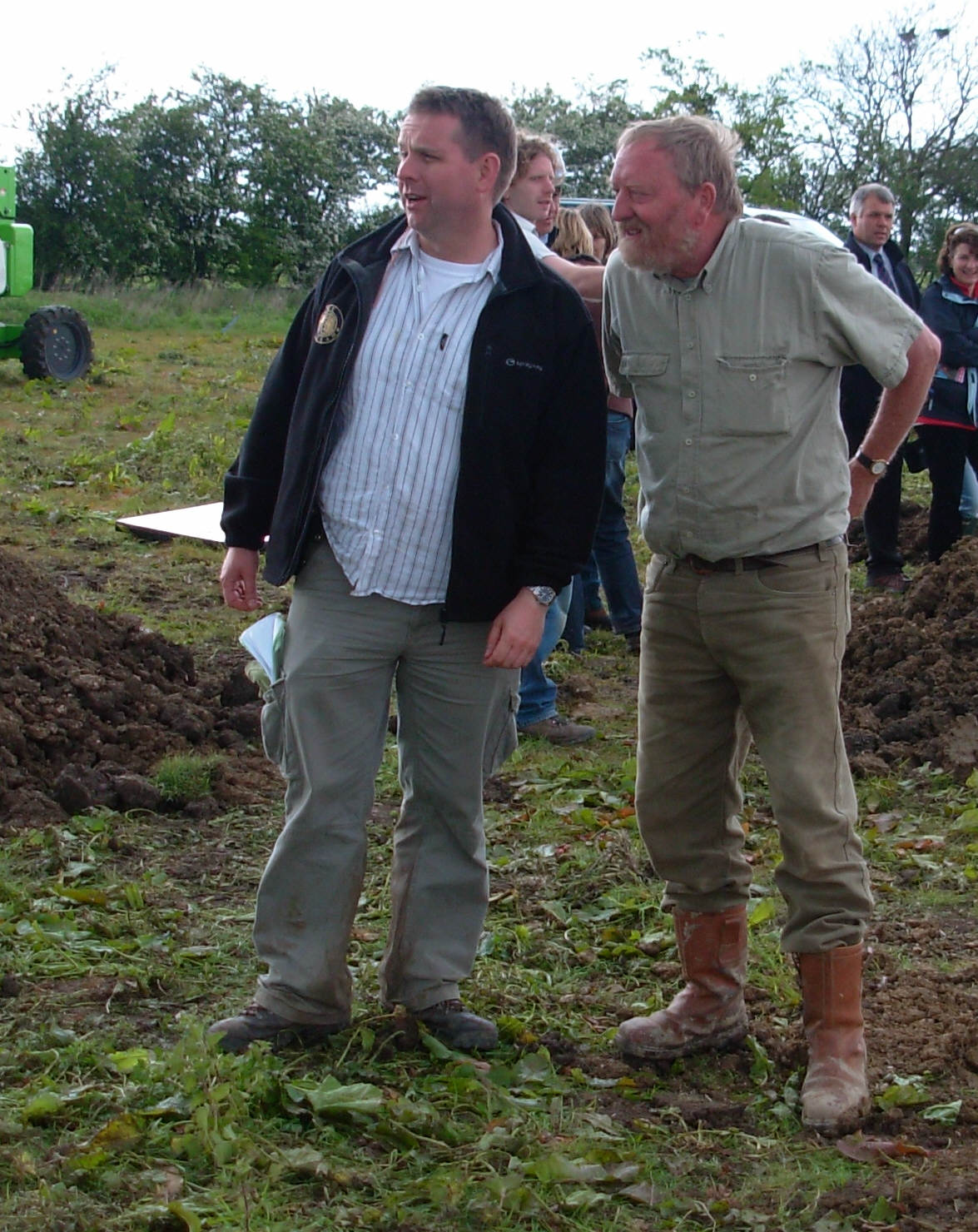
Pryor (right) discusses the excavation during the filming of a 2007 dig for Time Team with series editor Michael Douglas (left).

Pryor is the son of Barbara Helen Robertson and Robert Matthew Marlborough Pryor MBE TD (known as Matthew), as well as being the grandson of Walter Marlborough Pryor DSO DL JP; both his grandfather and father had been British Army officers, serving in the First and Second World Wars respectively. He was educated at the private Temple Grove School in East Sussex, then at Eton College alongside his first cousin William Pryor, before studying archaeology at Trinity College, Cambridge, gaining a PhD in 1985.

He married Sylvia in 1969 and emigrated with her to Toronto, Ontario, Canada, on a landed immigrant scheme. There he started working at the Royal Ontario Museum as technician, working for Doug Tushingham, who helped fund Pryor's first project in the United Kingdom. This was at North Elmham in Norfolk, and the excavation was directed by Peter Wade-Martins, who exposed Pryor to the benefit of opening large-area excavations.

Pryor returned to the UK in 1970, where the construction of the new town at Peterborough offered the opportunity to do large-scale archaeology ahead of the planned development work. Between 1970 and 1978 he alternated between digs in the UK and writing up the excavation reports and giving presentations on his work in Canada. Pryor and his first wife were divorced in 1977, and during the course of these projects he met his second wife, Maisie Taylor, an expert in prehistoric wood, who later also appeared on Time Team; they worked together on the series of projects in the Peterborough area, the most famous of which is Flag Fen. He has a daughter, Amy, from his first marriage. He was a founding member of the Institute of Field Archaeologists in 1982.

In 1991 he published his first book about Flag Fen, entitled Flag Fen: Prehistoric Fenland Centre, for a series co-produced by English Heritage and B.T. Batsford. The final monograph on the site – entitled The Flag Fen Basin: Archaeology and environment of a Fenland Landscape – was published in 2001 as an English Heritage Archaeological Report. Pryor followed this with a third book on the site, published by Tempus in 2005. Entitled Flag Fen: Life and Death of a Prehistoric Landscape, it represented what he considered to be a "major revision" of his 1991 work, for instance rejecting the earlier ‘lake village’ concept. Pryor was awarded an MBE "for services to tourism" in the 1999 Queen's Birthday Honours.

In the early 2000s he made two short series for Channel 4, Britain BC (2003) and Britain AD (2004), where he argued that historic British cultural change had been through cultural adoption by a genetically unchanged population rather than large-scale migration.

Since his retirement from archaeology Pryor has devoted his time to sheep farming, being the owner of 40 acres of fenland pasture in Lincolnshire. In an interview with the Financial Times he asserted that through this vocation he felt a connection with the people of Bronze Age Britain, who also lived off this form of subsistence, before also expressing his opinion that human overpopulation represented a significant threat to the human species, urging people to have fewer children and eat less meat.

One of Pryor's four times great grandfathers was Samuel Hoare, the Quaker and founding member of the Society for Effecting the Abolition of the Slave Trade.

== Bibliography ==
- Flag Fen: Prehistoric Fenland Centre. English Heritage/B.T. Batsford, 1991.
- Farmers in Prehistoric Britain. Tempus, 1998. ISBN 0-7524-1477-1.
- The Flag Fen Basin: Archaeology and Environment of a Fenland Landscape. English Heritage, 2001.
- Seahenge: A Quest for Life and Death in Bronze Age Britain. HarperCollins, 2001. ISBN 0-00-710192-9.
- Britain BC: Life in Britain and Ireland before the Romans. HarperCollins, 2003. ISBN 0-00-712693-X.
- Britain AD: A Quest for Arthur, England and the Anglo-Saxons. HarperCollins, 2004. ISBN 0-00-718187-6.
- Flag Fen. Life and death of a Prehistoric Landscape. Tempus Publishing Ltd, Stroud, UK, 2005. ISBN 0-7524-2900-0.
- Britain in the Middle Ages: An Archaeological History. HarperCollins, 2006. ISBN 0-00-720362-4.
- The Making of the British Landscape: How We Have Transformed the Land, from Prehistory to Today. Allen Lane, 2010. ISBN 978-1-84614-205-5.
- The Birth of Modern Britain: A Journey into Britain's Archaeological Past: 1550 to the Present. HarperCollins, 2011. ISBN 978-0-00-729912-6.
- Flag Fen: A Concise Archæoguide. Boudicca Books, 2014. ebook
- The Lifers' Club. Cornerstone, 2014. ISBN 978-1-78-352028-2. (Alan Cadbury crime novel 1)
- Home: A Time Traveller's Tales from Britain's Prehistory. Allen Lane, 2014. ISBN 978-1-84-614487-5.
- Stonehenge. Head of Zeus, 2016. ISBN 978-1-78-497461-9.
- The Way, the Truth and the Dead. Cornerstone, 2017. ISBN 978-1-78-352326-9. (Alan Cadbury, crime novel 2)
- Paths to the Past: Encounters with Britain's Hidden Landscapes. Allen Lane, 2018. ISBN 978-0-24-129998-2.
- The Fens: Discovering England's Ancient Depths. Head of Zeus, 2019. ISBN 978-1-78-669222-1.
- Scenes from Prehistoric Life. Head of Zeus. 2021. ISBN 978-1-78-954414-5.
- A Fenland Garden: Creating a Haven for People, Plants and Wildlife. Head of Zeus. 2023. ISBN 978-1-80-110160-8.

=== TV documentaries ===
- Britain BC, a two-part Channel 4 series, 2003
- Britain AD, a three-part Channel 4 series, 2004

== See also ==
- W. G. Hoskins, author of The Making of the English Landscape
