= Church Farm Ditch =

River in East Sussex, England

Coordinates: 50.86432°N 0.3264°E

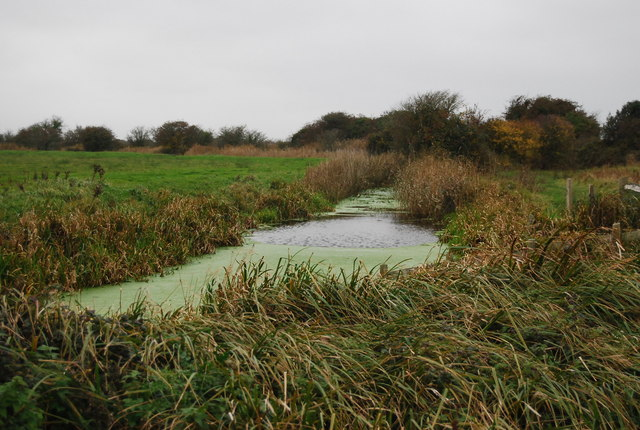
Church Farm Ditch, looking southwest

Church Farm Ditch is a minor, 1.2-kilometre (0.75 mi) long river—brook—and drainage ditch of the Pevensey Levels in Hailsham, Wealden District of East Sussex, England. Flowing a southeasterly course just south of Herstmonceux, it rises from Church Farm Feed and immediately gives rise to Curteis Ditch, before eventually flowing into Kentland Sewer. It is named after Church Farm, through which it flows. Church Farm Ditch also gives rise and receives the waters of several unnamed streams.
