= Tushingham (surname) =

Tushingham is a surname. Notable people with the surname include:

- Doug Tushingham (1914–2002), Canadian archaeologist
- Rita Tushingham (born 1942), English actress
- Sidney Tushingham (1884–1968), British painter and etcher

== See also ==
- Tushingham, a village in Cheshire, England
