= Glynleigh Sewer =

River in East Sussex, England

Coordinates: 50.8389°N 0.3095°E

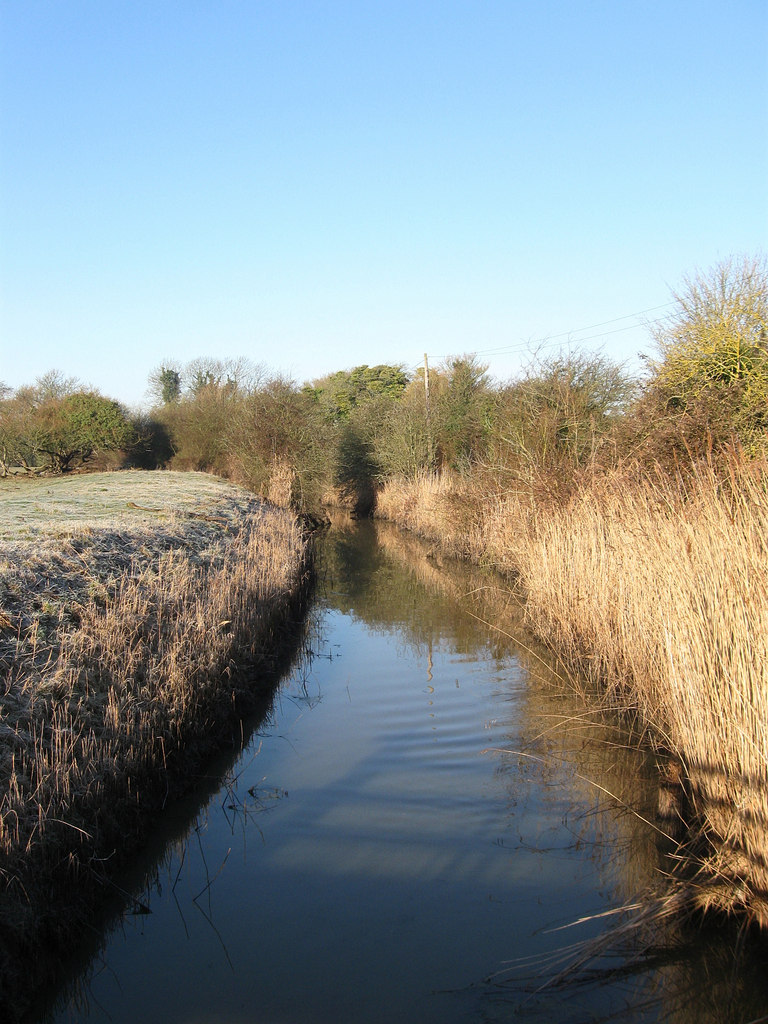
Glynleigh Sewer

Glynleigh Sewer is a river in Hailsham, Wealden District, East Sussex, England. Located partly in the Pevensey Levels, Glynleigh Sewer joins Hurst Haven to form the Pevensey Haven. The river forms much of the boundary between the civil parishes of Westham and Hailsham.

== Course ==
Glynleigh Sewer rises from a drainage basin in farmland north of the A27 road in Hailsham, receiving most of its waters from Marland Sewer. Glynleigh Sewer then flows a southerly course, receiving the waters of Drockmill Hill Gut, after which it flows into the Pevensey Levels which is where it joins Hurst Haven to form the Pevensey Haven.

== Water quality ==
Water quality assessments of the river in 2016 undertaken by the Environment Agency, a non-departmental public body sponsored by the United Kingdom's Department for Environment, Food and Rural Affairs:

Ammonia	Dissolved oxygen	Phosphate	Temperature	Section
Good	Bad	Moderate	High	Rickney Farm monitoring site
