= Church Farm Feed =

River in East Sussex, England

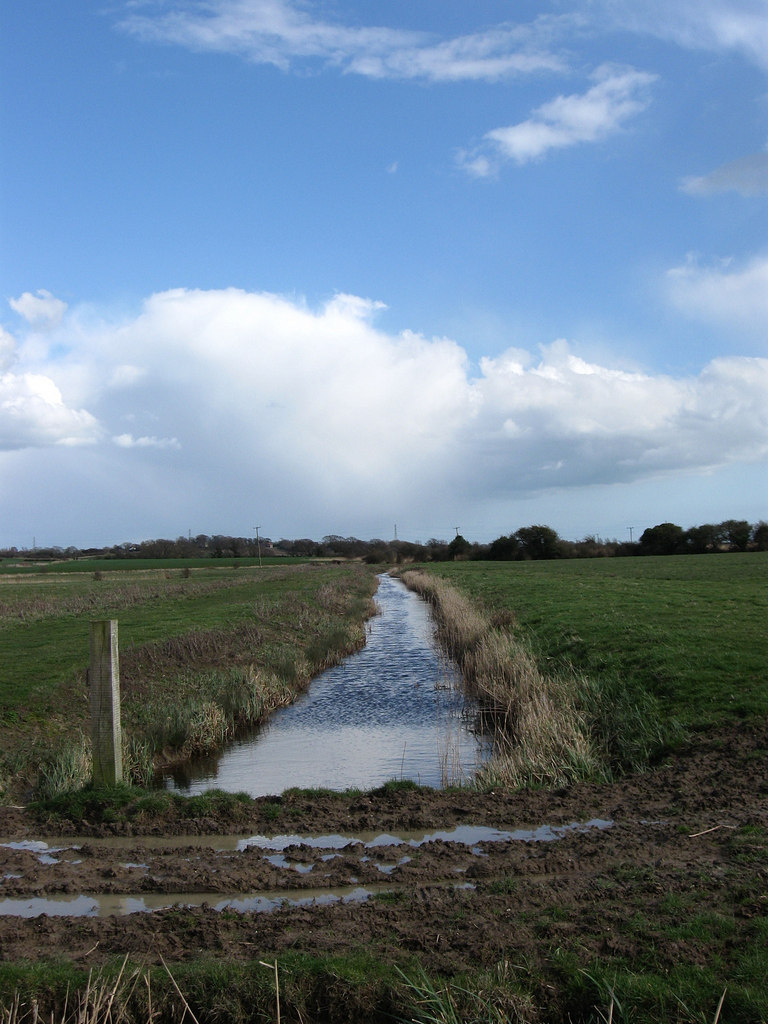
Church Farm Feed, looking east with Church Farm Ditch in the distance

Church Farm Feed is a minor, 603-metre (1,978 ft) long river—brook—and drainage ditch of the Pevensey Levels in Hailsham, Wealden District of East Sussex, England. Rising in Church Farm—from which it receives its name—the river flows an easterly course and gives rise to Church Farm Ditch. It also gives rise to and receives the waters of several unnamed streams.
