= Nucleated village =

Type of settlement pattern

A nucleated village, or clustered settlement, is one of the main types of settlement pattern. It is one of the terms used by geographers and landscape historians to classify settlements. It is most accurate with regard to planned settlements: its concept is one in which the houses, even most farmhouses within the entire associated area of land, such as a parish, cluster around a central church, which is perhaps close to the village green. Other possible focal points, depending on cultures and location, are a commercial square, circus, crescent, railway station, park or sports stadium.

A clustered settlement contrasts with these:

- dispersed settlement
- linear settlement
- polyfocal settlement: two (or more) adjacent nucleated villages that have expanded and merged to form a cohesive overall community

A sub-category of clustered settlement is a planned village or community, deliberately established by landowners or the stated and enforced planning policy of local authorities and central governments.

== England ==
One of many examples of a nucleated village in England is Shapwick, Somerset. (Note: This has been extensively investigated by Mick Aston)

Many nucleated villages originated in Anglo-Saxon England, but historian W. G. Hoskins discredits a previously held view that uniquely associated nucleated villages with that influx to England and their emergent society.

In England, nucleated settlements prevail for example in central parts of the country away from the rockiest soil and steepest slopes where open field farming predominated. In this landscape, the village was typically surrounded by two (or three) large fields in which villagers had individual strips – see open field system. Various explanations have been offered as to the reason for this form of settlement including the ethnic origin of the Anglo-Saxon settlers, density of population and the influence of local lords of the manor. Tom Williamson (Note: University of East Anglia) theorised in 2004 that the best explanation is the combination of soil quality and climate which leads to differences in agricultural techniques for exploiting local conditions.

Planned settlements can be clearly distinguished from other communities in the late medieval period when landowners began to en masse allocate two rows of new houses set on equal-sized plots of land – burgage plots. At the opposite end of the burgage plot there is often a back lane which gives the original village a regular layout, right-angled development, which can often still be seen today in England. In small villages, toft and croft landuse patterns have a similar effect. Planned villages were usually associated with markets, from which the landowner expected to make profits.

== Central Europe ==
In central Europe, nucleated villages have also emerged from smaller settlements and many farmsteads (equivalent to many hamlets) grew in population to become larger settlements. These villages generally have an irregular shape but are roughly circularly grouped around a central place such as a church or a feature easy to defend.

== Israel ==
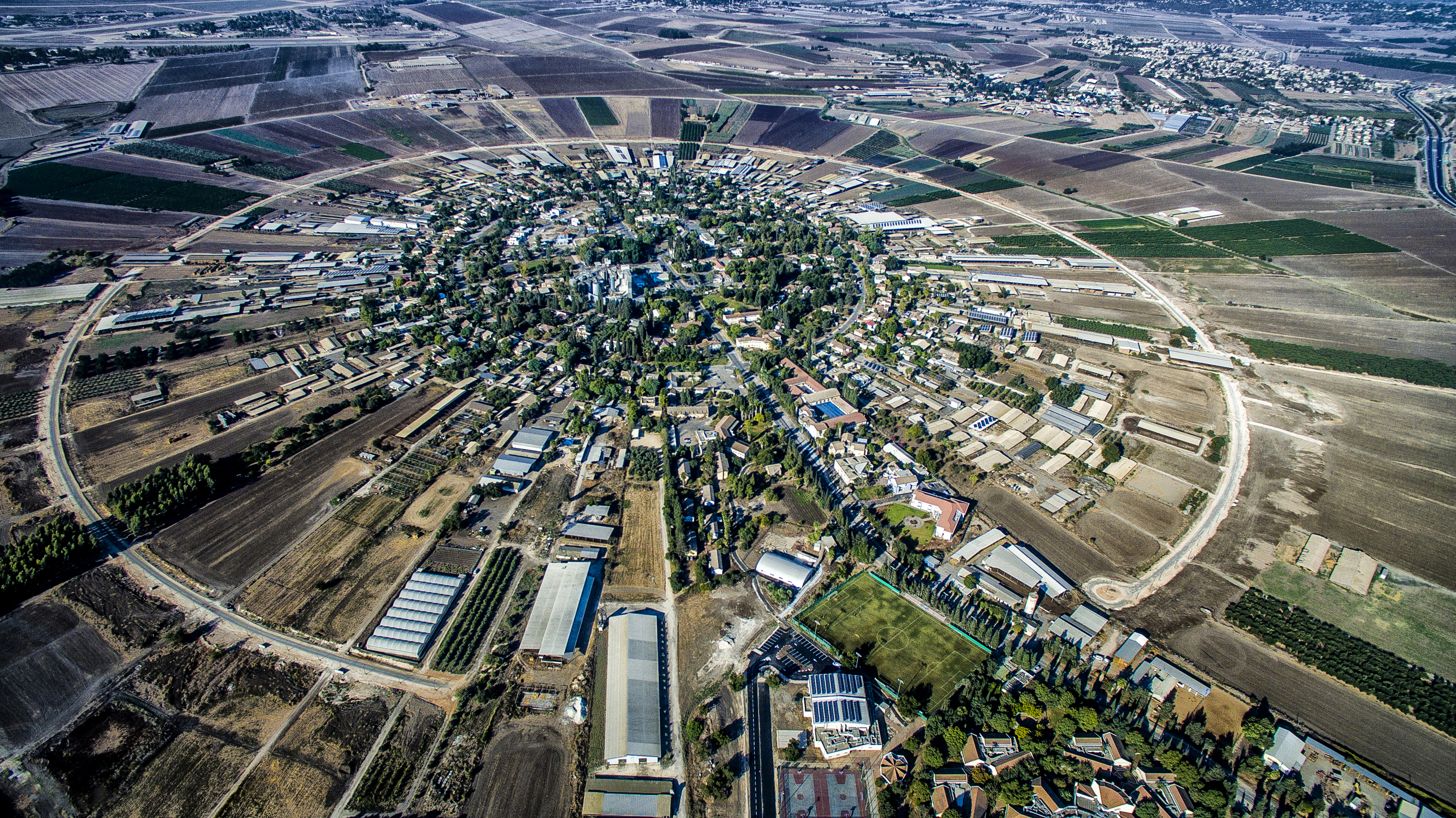
Moshav Nahalal in Jezreel Valley

As a modern example, many kibbutzim and moshavim, built from the start as planned settlements, follow the nucleated pattern. Strips of agricultural land often radiate directly outwards.

Over time, some of those grew into less regular forms; others, however, retain the clear nucleated structure to this day.

== See also ==
- Haufendorf, a type of enclosed village in Germany, Austria and Switzerland

== Notes and references ==
Notes
