= The Making of the English Landscape =

Book about history of England's landscapes by William George Hoskins

- Cover of the first edition
- Author: W. G. Hoskins
- Illustrator: Photographs, maps and plans by the author
- Subject: Landscape history
- Publisher: Hodder and Stoughton
- Publication date: 1954
- Publication place: England
- Media type: Print

From 1970 onwards, Penguin Books released versions of The Making of the English Landscape in numerous reprints, alongside hardback editions from Hodder and Stoughton and other publishers.

The Making of the English Landscape is a 1954 book by the English local historian William George Hoskins. The book is also the introductory volume in a series of the same name which deals with the English Landscape county by county.

It is illustrated with 82 monochrome plates, mostly photographs by Hoskins himself, and 17 maps or plans. It has appeared in at least 35 editions and reprints in English and other languages.

The book is a landscape history of England and a seminal text in that discipline and in local history. The brief history of some one thousand years is widely used in local and environmental history courses.

Hoskins defines the theme of the book in the first chapter, arguing that a landscape historian needs to use botany, physical geography and natural history as well as historical knowledge to interpret any given scene fully. The remaining chapters describe how the English landscape was formed from the Anglo-Saxon period onwards, starting c.450 AD, and looking in detail at the mediaeval landscape, the depopulation following the Black Death, the Tudor period through to the splendour of the Georgian period, the parliamentary enclosures that affected much of the English midlands, the Industrial Revolution, the development of road, canal, and railway transport networks, and finally the growth of towns from Norman times onwards. There is little mention of cities. The concluding chapter, however, laments the damage done to the English countryside by "the villainous requirements of the new age" such as military airfields and arterial roads, describes the new England as barbaric, and invites the reader to contemplate the past.

The work has been widely admired, but also described as grandly emotive, populist, and openly anti-modernist. Writers have praised the book for helping them understand and interpret the landscape in which they lived.

== Book ==
=== Overview ===
The introduction sets out Hoskins' stall with "No book exists to describe the manner in which the various landscapes of this country came to assume the shape and appearance they now have", mentioning geology ("only one aspect of the subject"), the clearing of woodlands, the reclaiming of moor and marsh, the creation of fields, roads, towns, country houses, mines, canals and railways: "in short, with everything that has altered the natural landscape."

=== Editions and translations ===
"A sunken lane in East Devon". A 7th-century Saxon estate boundary between the royal estate of Silverton (left) and the Exeter Abbey estate (right) was marked by a "double ditch", creating high earth hedgebanks on both sides.

The first edition was published by Hodder and Stoughton in 1954. They reprinted the book in 1956, 1957, 1960, 1963, 1965, 1967, 1969, 1970, 1971, 1974, 1977. They issued a new edition in 1988, a revised edition in 1992, and a new edition in 2005, reissued in 2006. They published Korean and Japanese editions in 2008.

In 1970, Penguin Books published a paperback Pelican edition in England and a Penguin edition in the United States. Penguin reprinted in 1973, 1974, 1975, 1977, 1978, 1979, 1981, 1983, 1985, 1986, 1988, 1991, and 2005.

From 1977 onwards, further editions were published in England by Book Club Associates, Coronet Books, Teach Yourself Books, the Folio Society, and Little Toller books.

=== Illustrations ===
The book is illustrated with 82 monochrome plates and 17 maps or plans, all uncredited except for some use of Ordnance Survey maps, and so apparently the work of Hoskins himself. These are closely integrated into the text; for example, the text in chapter 1 is accompanied by a pair of diagrams showing how a holloway ('hollow way') could be formed by the digging of a "double ditch", i.e. a pair of raised earth banks either side of a ditch to mark the boundary of two estates, and supported by a photograph (Plate 13) of a sunken lane in Devon, explained by Hoskins as a boundary, from probably the 7th century, between the Saxon estates of (royal) Silverton and Exeter Abbey. The photograph shows high hedgebanks in bright sunshine, dwarfing the figure of a woman in the middle distance.

== Contents ==
Hoskins begins with praise for Wordsworth's A Guide through the District of the Lakes (1810), quoting a passage asking the reader to envisage "an image of the tides visiting and revisiting the friths, the main sea dashing against the bolder shore". Hoskins writes that on a desolate moor one can feel oneself back in the Bronze Age, but that there are now few such places left. He argues that the landscape historian "needs to be a botanist, a physical geographer, and a naturalist, as well as an historian" to understand a scene and all its patterns. Hoskins estimates that 750,000 acres at most were in use as arable or grassland in Roman times, compared to 27 million acres in 1914.

He describes how England was settled with Anglo-Saxon people between c.450 and 1066 AD, making the country a land of villages. Estate boundaries survive in sunken lanes and banks. The Scandinavian conquest from the late 9th century added more villages, though Scandinavian placename elements such as -by ('village') may have been renamed Saxon settlements. Many English villages are described in the 11th-century Domesday Book. Hoskins identifies three major types: those around a green, as at Finchingfield; those along a street, like Henley in Arden; and those consisting of scattered dwellings, like Hoskins' home at Barton, Oxfordshire.

Hoskins looks at the mediaeval landscape from the Domesday Book onwards, with the section "The Landscape in 1086". The country had almost every village that exists today; a typical one, Hoskins writes, had a small watermill and a church without a spire. He argues that before the 15th century England must have looked like one great forest. Under Henry II perhaps a third of England was royal forest. He describes the complex mediaeval detail of areas like The Wash. Marshes in Lincolnshire, Norfolk and the Pevensey Levels were reclaimed, often under the Danelaw. Abbeys, churches, mills, bridges and castles were built to serve the population, which had tripled since Domesday.

He describes the abandonment of villages from the 1348 Black Death, which killed up to half the population, and subsequent building as the population recovered. Marginal land such as the thinly-populated Breckland was abandoned; many villages were deserted, surviving only as ground-plans seen from the air. Between 1350 and 1500, many new buildings appeared, especially churches with towers like Fotheringhay. Some fine bridges as at Wadebridge in Cornwall are from this period.

Hoskins observes that in 1500 in Tudor times there were roughly three sheep for every human being in England. There were four million acres of hardwood forest, surviving fragments including the Forest of Arden, Sherwood Forest, and the Forest of Dean. A village might be surrounded by a single thousand acre field, shared amongst all its farmers. Extensive heaths were largely uninhabited. The first enclosures and the flowering of rural England, country houses and parks such as Burghley House and Knole date from this period up to Georgian times.

Hoskins describes the effects of enclosure on the landscape. He begins by quoting the rural poet John Clare: "Inclosure, thou'rt a curse upon the land, and tasteless was the wretch who thy existence plann'd". Parliamentary enclosures accounted for about 4.5 million acres of what had been open fields. In 1700 roughly half England's arable land was already enclosed; eventually, almost all of it was. By 1844 there had been some 2,500 enclosure acts, covering 4 million acres. Many miles of new straight hedgerows were laid; many straight new roads were created.

The Industrial Revolution began with water power, followed by steam power and slums. Hoskins names transformative inventions such as Kay's 1733 flying shuttle and Hargreaves's 1767 spinning jenny, commenting that Matthew Boulton opened his steam engine factory in unspoilt countryside outside Birmingham in 1765. He quotes a poem by Anna Seward lamenting the ravishing of Coalbrookdale, c.1785. He is critical of the slums and smoke of the Staffordshire Potteries. Industrial towns like Preston grew rapidly; the new town of Middlesbrough went from a single farm in 1830 to over 50,000 inhabitants in 1880. He appreciates the mining landscapes of Cornwall, including the gleaming white china clay pits of St Austell and the abandoned tin mines of St Cleer.

Hoskins describes roads from the Iron Age (like the Jurassic Way) and Roman times (like Akeman Street). The Fosse Way runs for miles in Gloucestershire away from any village, as the Anglo-Saxons avoided large roads for safety. He describes the building of the canal network between 1760 and 1825, creating just one town, Stourport. Soon, a much larger transport network transformed the landscape: the railways.

Hoskins covers towns seen as part of the English landscape, describing planned towns, the open-field town, and the market town. Towns were planned as early as Norman times, Abbot Baldwin planning Bury St Edmunds between 1066 and 1086; Stratford-on-Avon was laid out in 1196. Another burst of town planning came with the spa towns in the late 18th century, and of new industrial towns like Middlesbrough and Barrow-in-Furness in the mid-19th century. Towns like Nottingham, Leicester, and Stamford grew naturally in their own open fields. Finally, market towns like Marlborough grew up around their market places.

The book ends with one image, "The completed English landscape", showing a tall tree in a wide open field, a strip of hedges and villages just visible in the distance. The chapter laments the damage caused to parts of the English landscape, mentioning bulldozers and tractors, nuclear bombers and by-passes, and ends by celebrating the wealth of detail within a few hundred yards of Hoskins' study window.

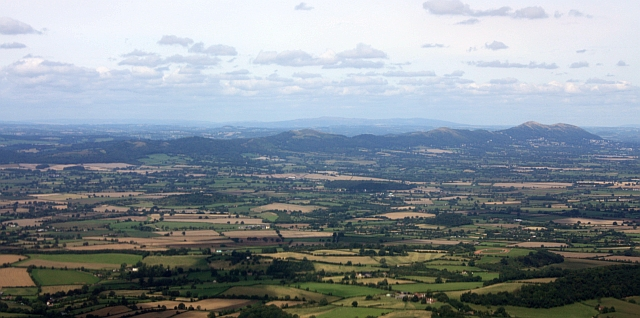
The Malvern Hills above the Severn plain of the English West Midlands

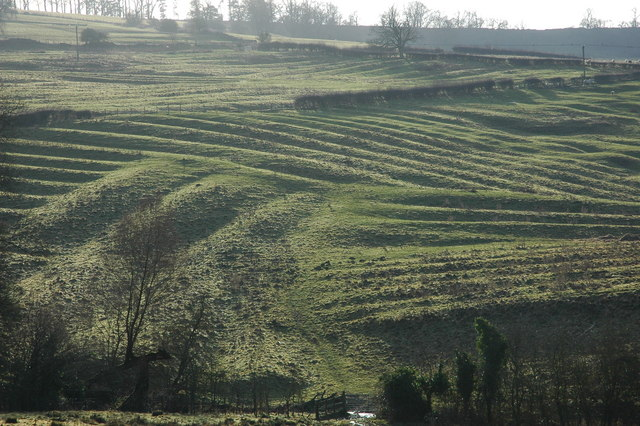
Mediaeval ploughing created a ridge and furrow pattern in open field system farming.

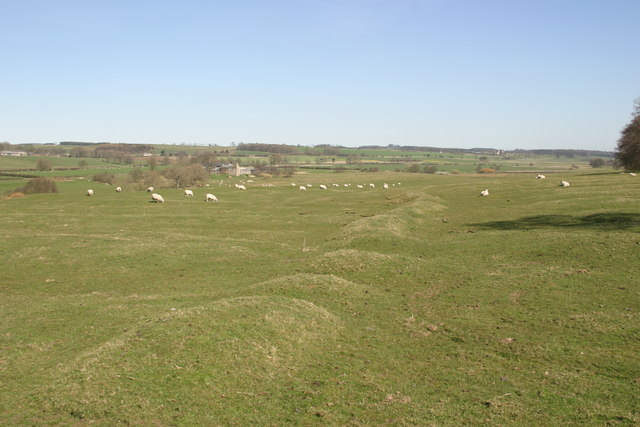
South Middleton, a deserted village in Northumberland

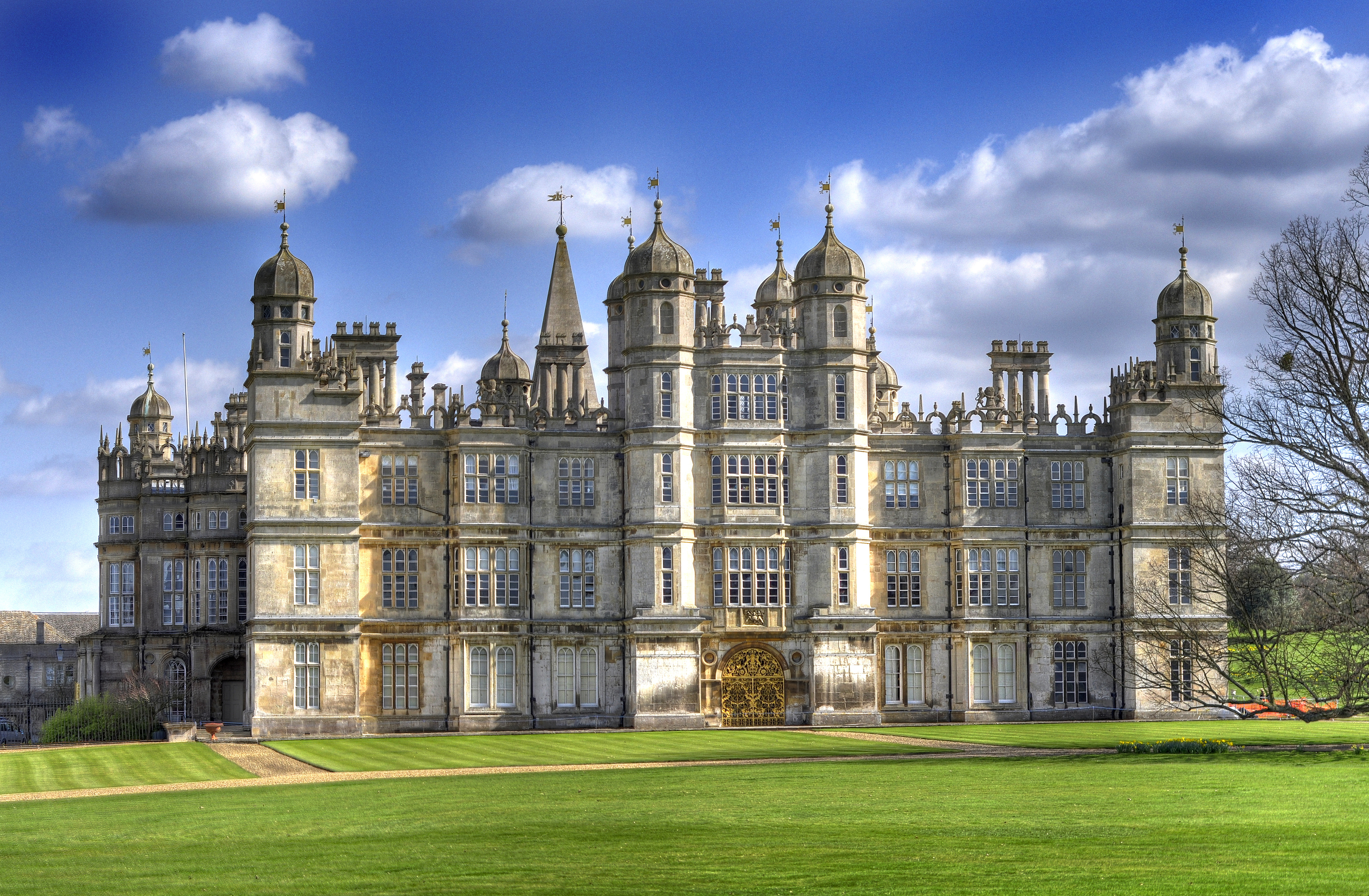
The façade of Burghley House, built between 1558 and 1587

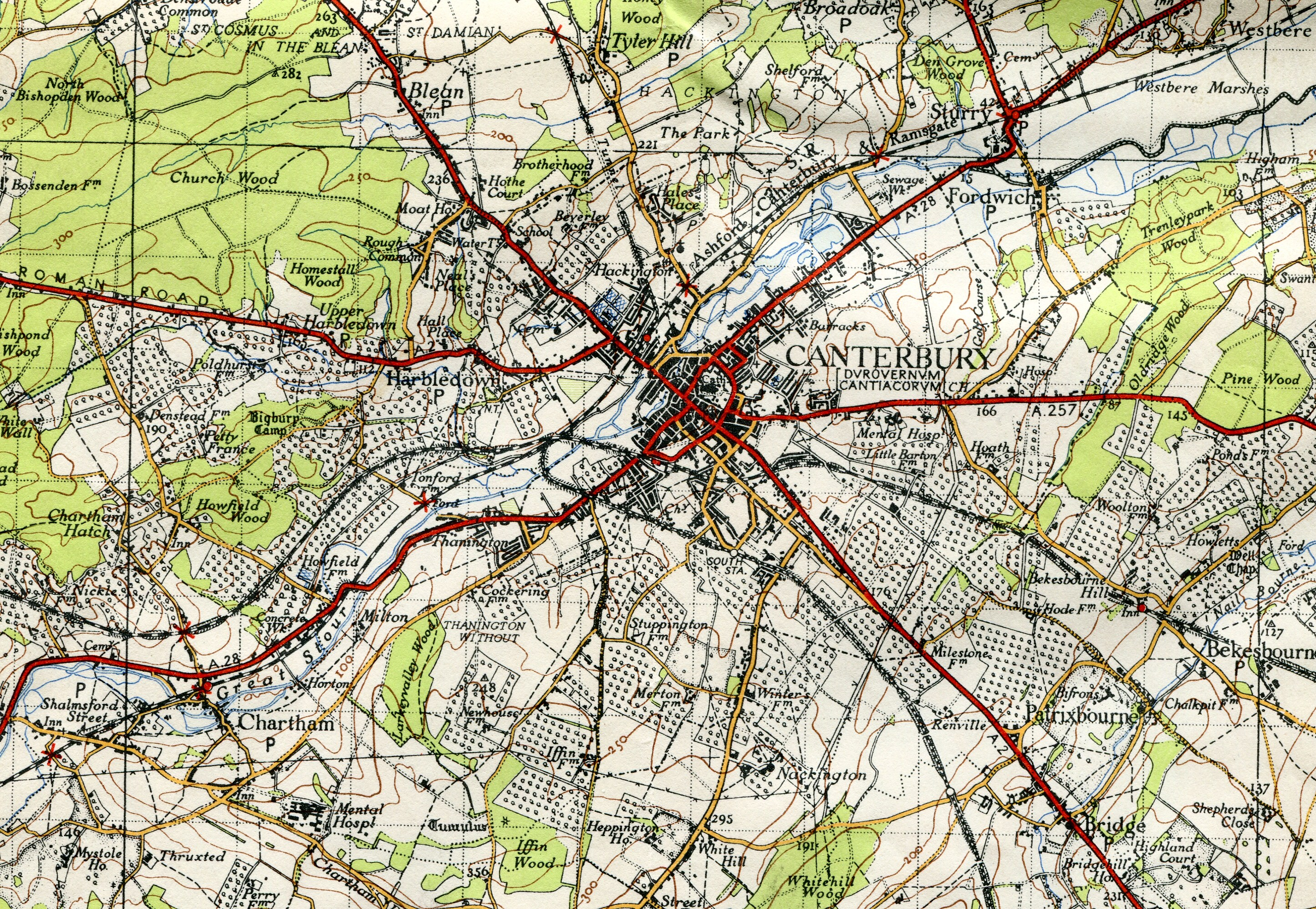
Orchards around Canterbury, Kent showing mediaeval enclosures from the woods

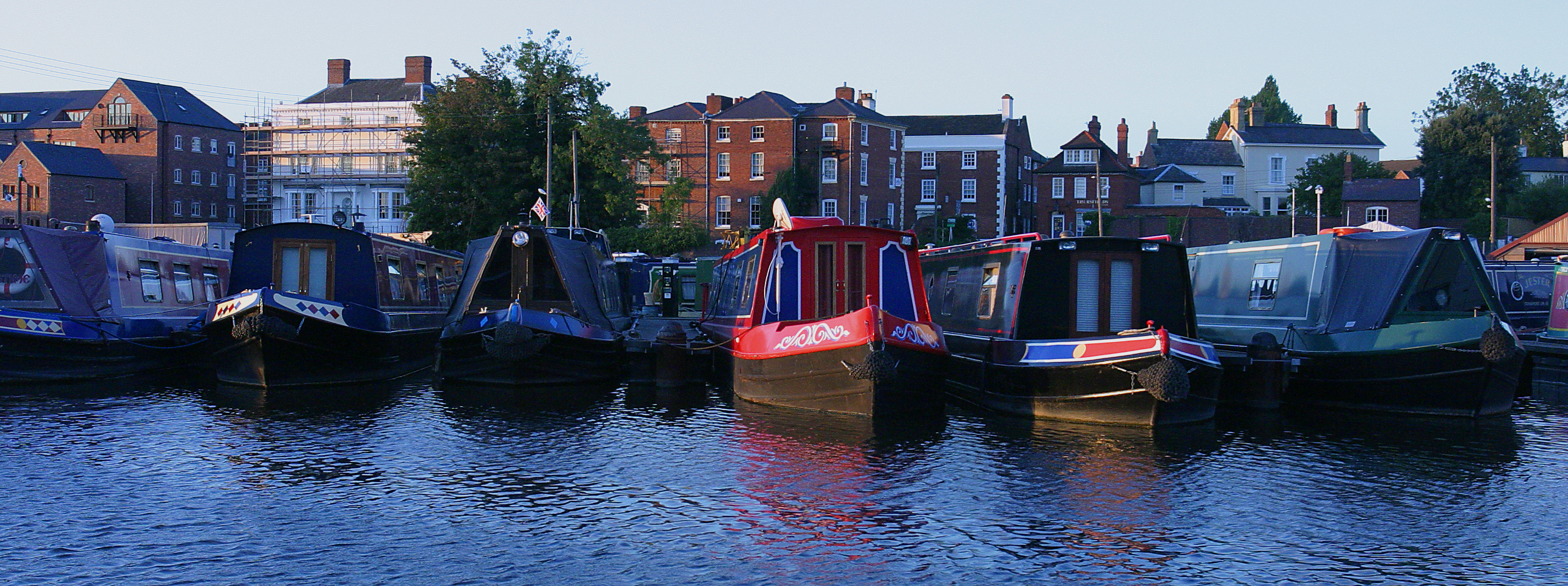
The canal basin at Stourport, the only town in England to be created by canals

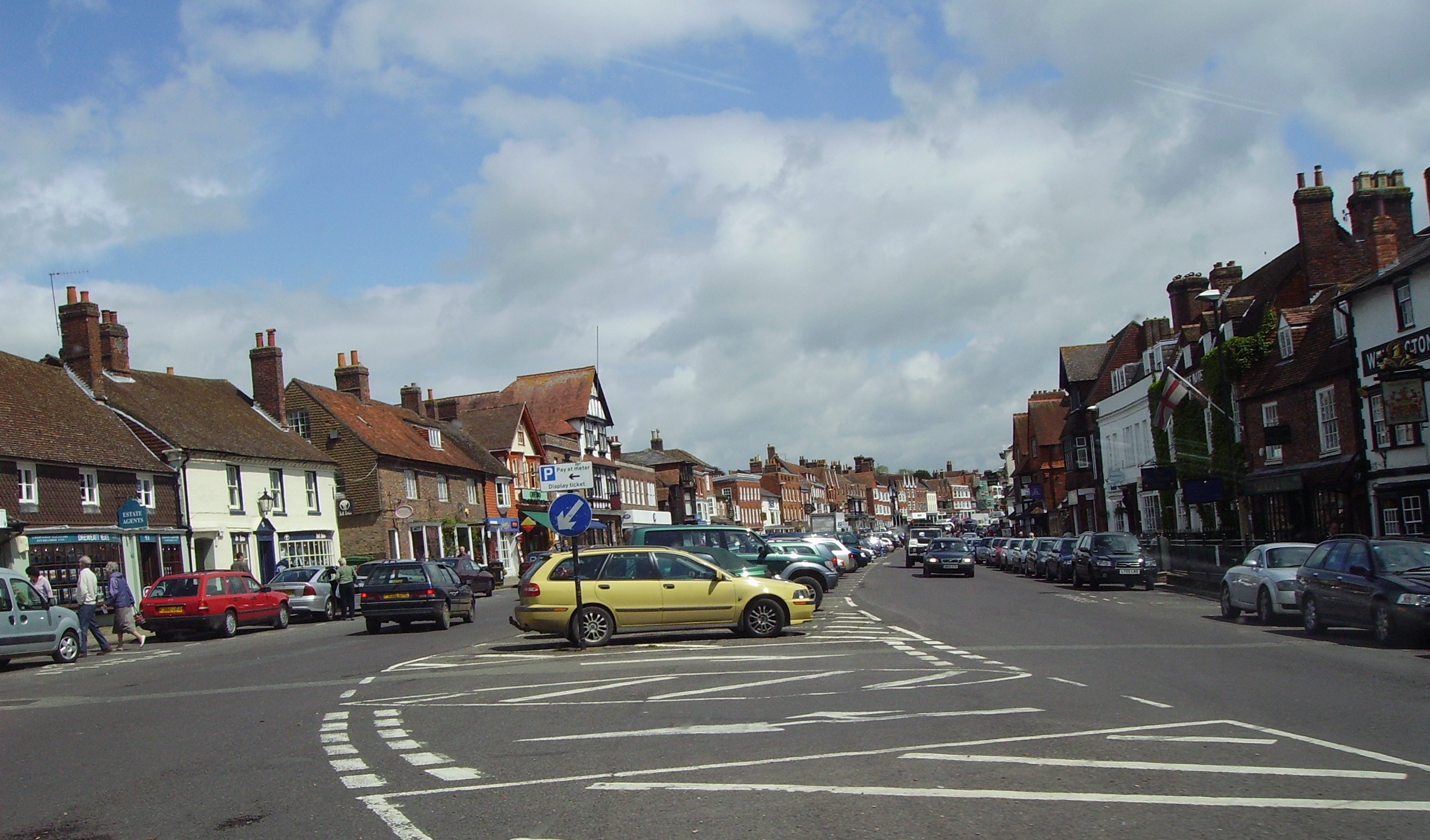
The former sheep market in the centre of Marlborough

== Reception ==
=== Contemporary ===
The geographer E. G. R. Taylor, reviewing the book for the Royal Geographical Society in 1955, wrote that Hoskins made the case for getting a strong pair of boots to learn landscape history clearly enough. Taylor compared the book to Dudley Stamp's Man and the Land, published a few months earlier in 1955, saying that Hoskins seemed to have missed it, but that given the differences in their approaches, they could be read side by side. She noted also that Hoskins did not talk about London though he covered town landscapes, and appeared unaware of urban geography. Her review ended by remarking that Hoskins "views the industrial revolution with mounting horror, and the industrialists themselves are bitterly chastised as 'completely and grotesquely insensitive. No scruples weakened their lust for money; they made their money and left their muck.'" She noted however that Hoskins had happily moved to "a quiet spot in Oxfordshire where he can forget the 'barbaric England of the scientists, the military men and the politicians' and look out of his study window on to the past", where, she wrote, he "draws for us a last tender and evocative picture of the 'gentle unravished English landscape.'" Dr. Hoskins, she wrote, forgetting all the horrors, "reaches back through the centuries one by one and rediscovers Eden".

=== Modern ===
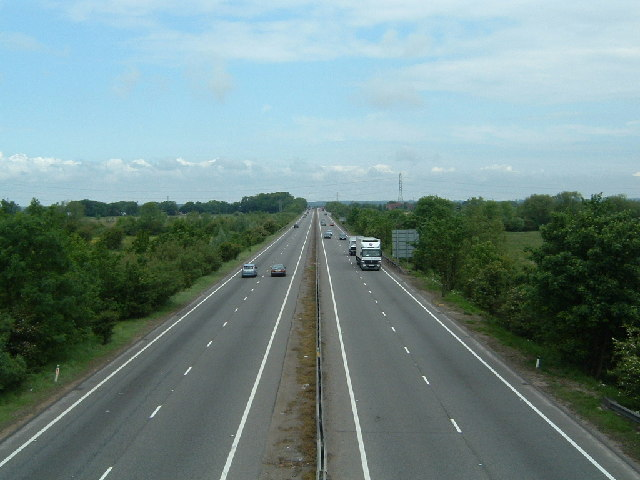
The A34 in Oxfordshire: "the arterial by-pass, treeless and stinking of diesel oil, murderous with lorries"

Penelope Lively, writing in The Guardian, describes the book as

a marvellous, robust, opinionated account of the landscape as narrative, whether rural or urban, the visible record of what has gone before, once you know how to read it – or once he has told you how. You were to put on your walking boots and understand the country in which you lived. Plenty did, or tried to; I did.

William Boyd, also in The Guardian, described the book as "an absolute trailblazer, a revolution." He notes that W. H. Auden "revered" the book, and that reading Hoskins had enabled him to "read" a landscape as a "historical palimpsest":

The familiar English countryside, in whatever regional variation, became a form of historical palimpsest – its evolving history there to be decoded and discerned for those who could look at it through the innovative lens that Hoskins provided. It was as if the landscape was all of a sudden an archaeological dig – hills and dales, woods and copses, fields and rivers, villages and roads ceased to be simple features of a view. Instead the whole history of English humankind and husbandry was on display, from the Holocene age to the latest horrors of agribusiness. And the book in which that history was written was the very land itself.

The local historian Graeme White, in The Medieval English Landscape, 1400–1540, calls Hoskins' book "brilliantly-crafted" and observes that "Although this famously railed against the 'England of the arterial by-pass, treeless and stinking of diesel oil' – along with much else belonging to the mid-twentieth century – the fact that national car ownership more than doubled during the 1950s made this a subject whose time had come."

Paul Johnson, writing in The Spectator, said that the book "was for me an eye-opener, as it was for many people. It told us of the extent to which our landscape had been made by man, not God, and taught us to look much more observantly at it."

=== An assessment ===
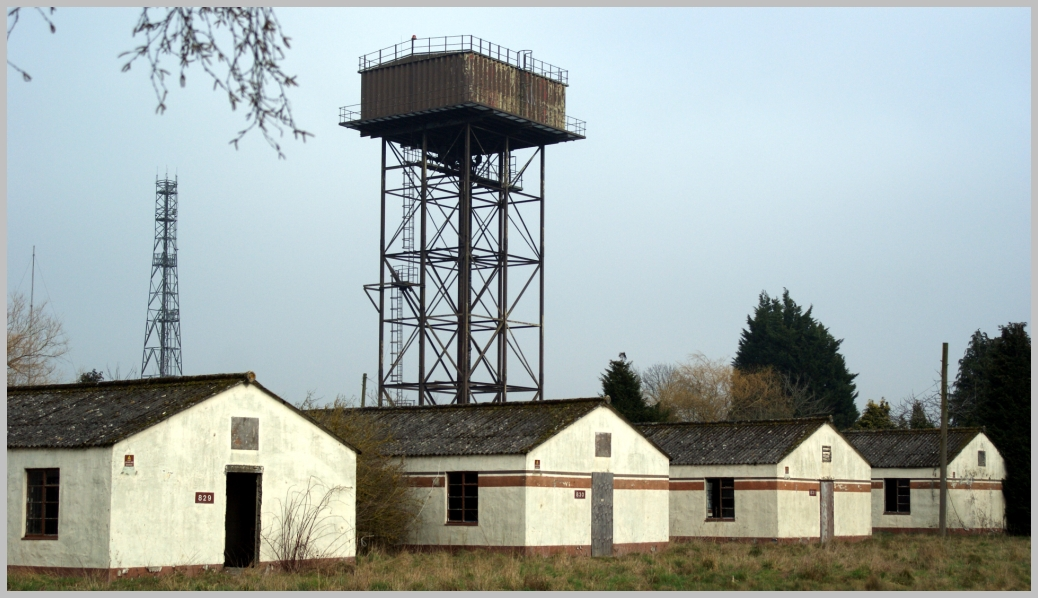
Part of the United States Air Force base at Upper Heyford, from where "the obscene shape of the atom-bomber" deplored by Hoskins flew daily over Oxfordshire

Matthew H. Johnson, writing a chapter on English culture and landscape in the edited book The Public Value of the Humanities, identifies "six key points" established by Hoskins:

1. The landscape is of great antiquity ("everything is much older than we think")
2. Landscapes often changed suddenly, as in the 18th-century enclosures.
3. Hoskins, following O. G. S. Crawford's 1953 Archaeology in the Field, stressed we had to read the landscape using research to reveal its cultural value.
4. Hoskins thus told a "grand and emotive story about that landscape." Johnson compares this to J. R. R. Tolkien's account in The Lord of the Rings when the hobbits return to a "despoiled and industrialized landscape of the Shire".
5. The narrative is populist, to be disseminated "to anyone who would listen." The result was that it became part of English post-war culture.
6. It was "openly anti-modernist". In evidence, Johnson cites Hoskins' "most famous passage" from the concluding chapter:

What else has happened in the immemorial landscape of the English countryside? Airfields have flayed it bare … Poor devastated Lincolnshire and Suffolk! And those long gentle lines of the dip-slope of the Cotswolds, those misty uplands of the sheep-grey oolite, how they have lent themselves to the villainous requirements of the new age! Over them drones, day after day, the obscene shape of the atom-bomber, laying a trail like a filthy slug upon Constable's and Gainsborough's sky. England of the Nissen-hut, the "pre-fab", and the electric fence, of the high barbed wire around some unmentionable devilment; England of the arterial by-pass, treeless and stinking of diesel oil, murderous with lorries; England of the bombing-range wherever there was once silence … Barbaric England of the scientists, the military men, and the politicians; let us turn away and contemplate the past before all is lost to the vandals.

— W. G. Hoskins, The Making of the English Landscape, Chapter 10.

== Television ==
In 1972 the BBC broadcast an episode of the television programme Horizon on The Making of the English Landscape produced by Peter Jones, and featuring Hoskins as presenter. Although the programme was inspired by the original book, Hoskins wrote an 84-page illustrated BBC book, English Landscapes, to accompany the programme. Later in the 1970s, Jones went on to produce a series of 12 TV programmes for BBC2, Landscapes of England, in which additional areas of the country were studied, leading to a further title, One Man's England to accompany the series.

== See also ==
- Francis Pryor, author of The Making of the British Landscape
