= Boundstone =

Boundstone may refer to:

- Boundstone (rock), a type of carbonate rock
- A stone marking an historical boundary
