= Sackville Sewer =

River in East Sussex, England

Coordinates: 50.8677°N 0.3103°E

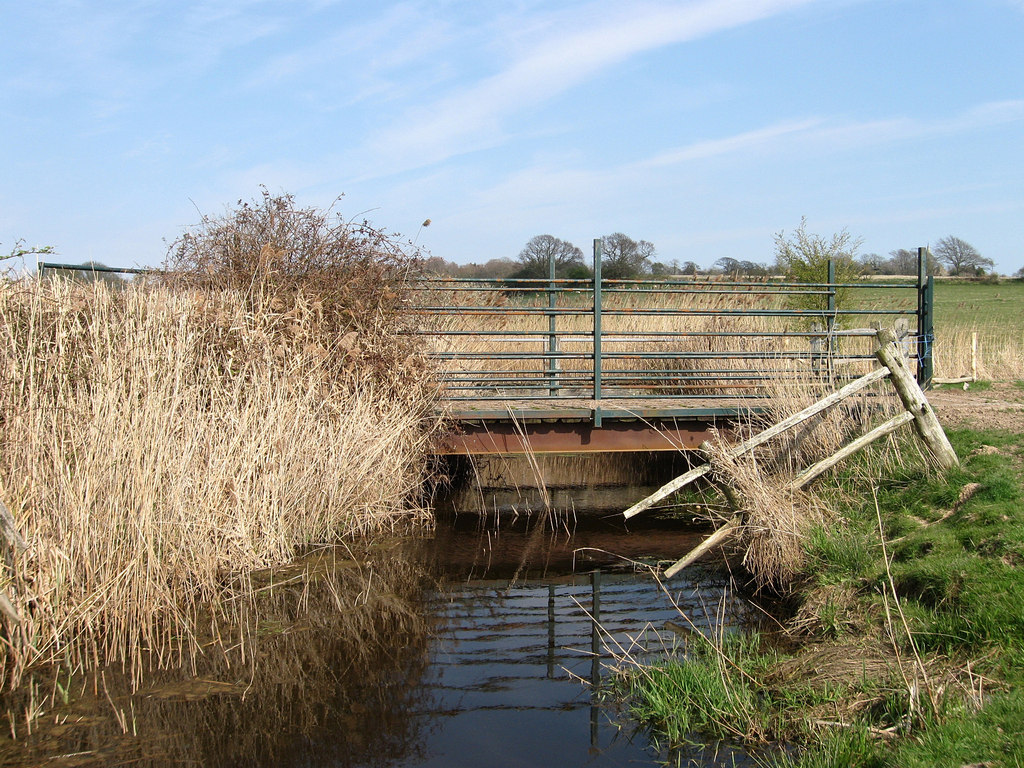
A footbridge over Sackville Sewer

Sackville Sewer is a minor, 1.7-kilometre (1.1 mi) long river (brook) and drainage ditch of the Pevensey Levels in Hailsham, Wealden District of East Sussex, England, that is a tributary to Bowley Sewer.

== Course ==
Located entirely in the civil parish of Hailsham, Sackville Sewer rises from Pevensey Mill Stream just south of the civil parish of Herstmonceux and flows southwesterly. It eventually turns briefly northerly before flowing a westerly course into Bowley Sewer, fronting an undesignated road.
