= Bill Gut =

River in East Sussex, England

Coordinates: 50.8174°N 0.3447°E

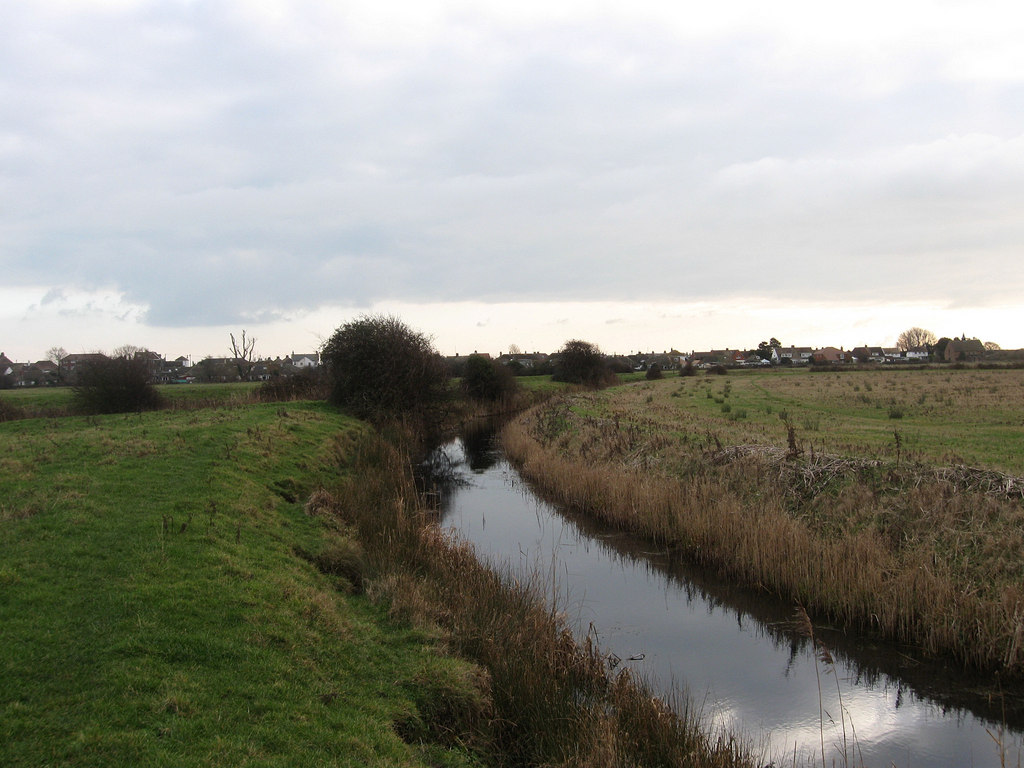
Bill Gut, looking south

Bill Gut is a minor, 1.2-kilometre (0.75 mi) long river (brook) and drainage ditch in the Pevensey Levels in Pevensey, Wealden District, East Sussex, England. Forming multiple distributaries, it rises from Langley Sewer and ultimately flows into Salt Haven—as does Langney Sewer.

== Etymology ==
According to the Survey of English Place-Names, Bill Gut was known as la bylle in 1527, le greate Bill marshe in 1617 and Bill Streaks in 1840.
