= Chilley Stream =

River in East Sussex, England

Coordinates: 50.8285°N 0.3270°E

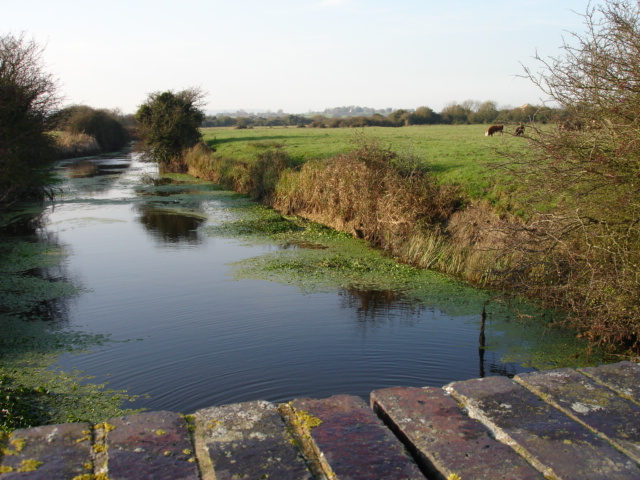
Chilley Stream, pictured in 2005

Chilley Stream is a minor, 3.41-kilometre (2.12 mi) long stream (brook) of the Pevensey Levels in Hailsham, in the Wealden District of East Sussex, England. It is a tributary of Pevensey Haven. Rising from Burgh Fleet and Monkham Sewer, Chilley Stream acts as a drainage ditch for several minor streams—including the distributary Manxey Sewer—although many of which are unnamed.

== Water quality ==
Water quality assessments of the river in 2016 undertaken by the Environment Agency, a non-departmental public body sponsored by the United Kingdom's Department for Environment, Food and Rural Affairs:

Ammonia	Biochemical oxygen demand	Dissolved oxygen	Phosphate	Temperature	Section
High	Moderate	Bad	Moderate	High	Chilley Bridge monitoring site
