= Kentland Fleet =

River in East Sussex, England

Kentland Fleet, looking northeast

Kentland Fleet is a river and drainage ditch of the Pevensey Levels in the civil parish of Hailsham, Wealden District of East Sussex, England. It rises from Kentland Sewer, receives the waters of Railland Ditch, and flows a northeasterly course back into Kentland Sewer. Kentland Fleet also gives rise to, and receives the waters of, several unnamed streams. According to the Environment Agency as of 2019, the quality of fish in the river is "high".
