= Burgh Fleet and Monkham Sewer =

River in East Sussex, England

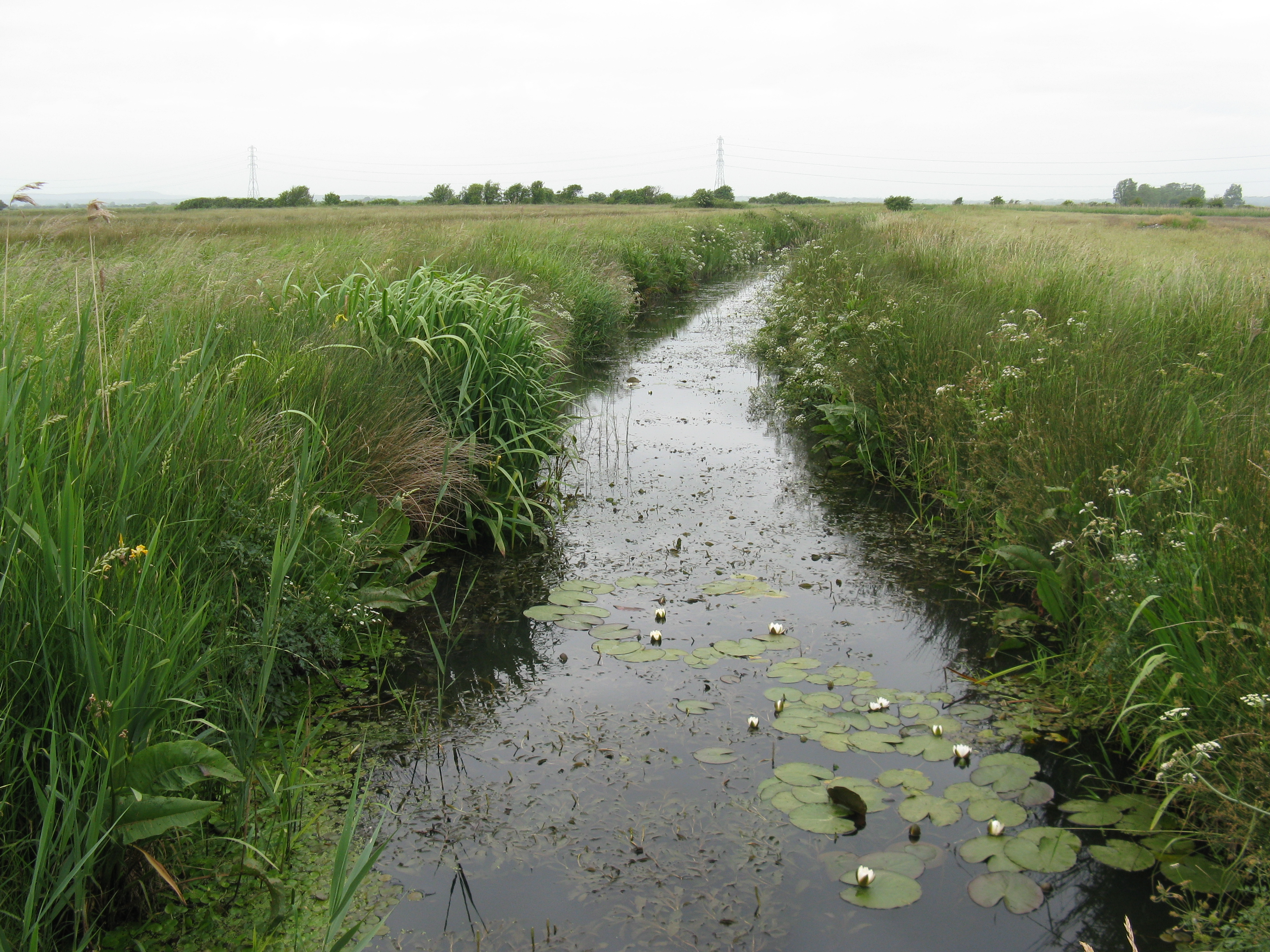
Burgh Fleet and Monkham Sewer immediately after flowing underneath Wartling Road; looking west

Burgh Fleet and Monkham Sewer is a minor, 2-kilometre (1.2 mi) long river—brook—and drainage ditch of the Pevensey Levels in Hailsham, Wealden District of East Sussex, England. It rises at Manxey Pumping Station in the civil parish of Wartling, briefly flowing southerly before turning westward and flowing underneath Wartling Road via a culvert. After receiving the waters of Sew Ditch, Burgh Fleet and Monkham Sewer resumes its southerly course for 901 metres (2,956 ft) before giving rise to Chilley Stream in the Russells in the Marsh field.
