= Dispersed settlement =

Rural settlement type

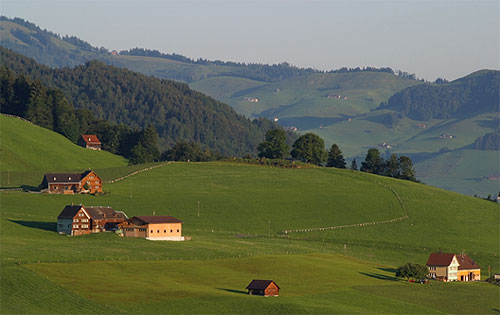
Dispersed settlement or Streusiedlung in Brülisau, Appenzell Innerrhoden, Switzerland

A dispersed settlement, also known as a scattered settlement, is one of the main types of settlement patterns used by landscape historians to classify rural settlements found in England and other parts of the world. Typically, there are a number of separate farmsteads scattered throughout the area. A dispersed settlement contrasts with a nucleated village.

The French term bocage is sometimes used to describe the type of landscape found where dispersed settlements are common.

In addition to Western Europe, dispersed patterns of settlement are found in parts of Papua New Guinea, as among the Gainj, Ankave, and Baining tribes. It is also frequently met with in nomadic pastoral societies. In Ghana, Kumbyili in the northern region is also an example of a dispersed settlement

== England ==
In England, dispersed settlements are often found in the areas of ancient enclosure outside the central region—for example, Essex, Kent and the West Country. An example of a dispersed settlement given by W G Hoskins is Middle Barton in Steeple Barton, Oxfordshire.

In some parts of England, the pattern of dispersed settlement has remained unchanged for many hundreds of years. Many of the locations found in Domesday may be dispersed farmsteads. It is sometimes possible to identify documentary references to farmsteads in the 18th and 19th centuries with these Domesday entries.

In areas of Kent and Essex close to London, the development of residential housing during the 20th century has often disguised the dispersed nature of the original settlement.

The farmsteads which make up the dispersed settlement are often surrounded by small irregularly shaped fields. Traditionally, trees are encouraged to grow at the edges of these fields and in thin strips alongside roads. However, during the 20th century, much of this woodland disappeared, either as a result of disease or modern farming practice. Arthur Young's description of the view from Langdon Hills, "dark lanes intersected with numberless hedges and woods," is a typical description of the landscape in an area of dispersed settlements.

== Italy ==
Anthony Galt has written an extensive study of the dispersed settlement pattern around Locorotondo in the Province of Bari in southern Italy. In this case, the settlement pattern developed because of movement from the town to the countryside in the 19th century. Emphyteutic leases were used by landowners seeking to increase their income from land that was only marginally attractive for agriculture by encouraging the creation of vineyards.

== German-speaking Europe ==
Known as Streusiedlungen (singular Streusiedlung), dispersed settlements are a characteristic of various parts of German-speaking Europe, including in areas of Westphalia, historically the Ruhr urban area (the dispersed settlements lending themselves to the development of urban sprawl after industrialisation), the Austro-Bavarian parts of the Alps (Upper Bavaria, Austria, South Tyrol) as well as Alamannic parts of the Alps (Bernese Oberland, Central Switzerland).
