= Curteis Ditch =

River in East Sussex, England

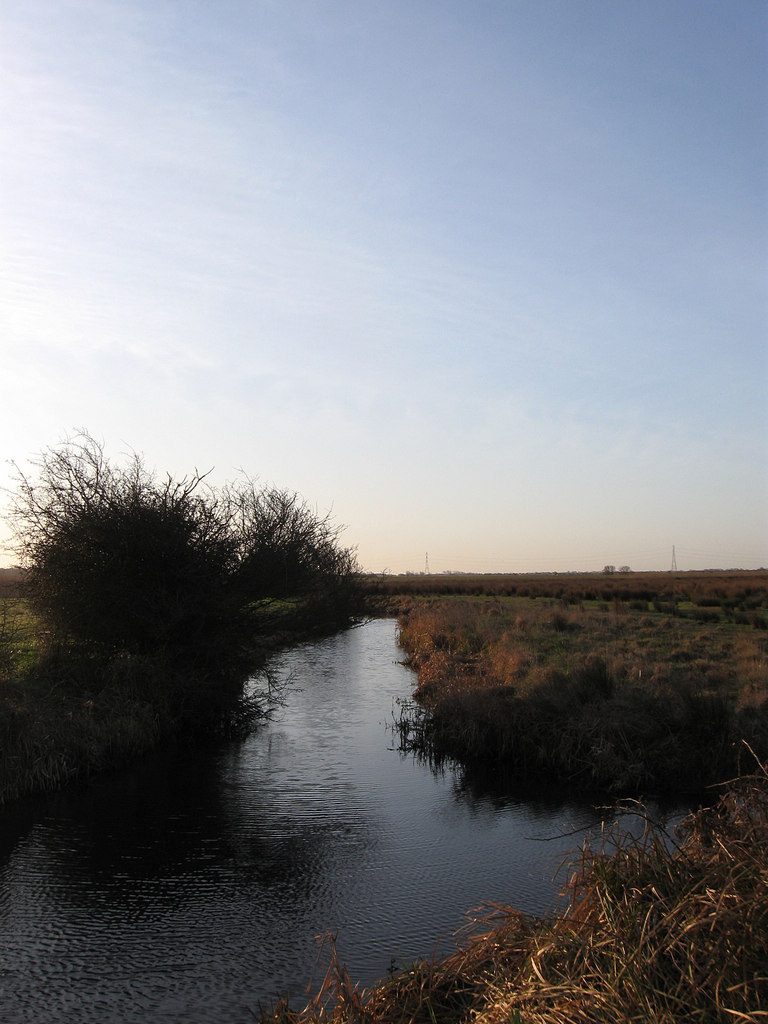
Curteis Ditch

Curteis Ditch is a minor, 1.4-kilometre (0.87 mi) long river—brook—and drainage ditch of the Pevensey Levels in Hailsham, Wealden District of East Sussex, England. It rises from Church Farm Ditch and flows a southerly course into Kentland Sewer. Curteis Ditch also gives rise to and receives the waters of several unnamed streams.
