= Sew Ditch =

River in East Sussex, England

Sew Ditch is a minor, 571-metre (1,873 ft) long river—brook—and drainage ditch of the Pevensey Levels in Hailsham, Wealden District of East Sussex, England. It rises from Kentland Sewer and flows southerly into Burgh Fleet and Monkham Sewer.
