= Manxey Sewer =

River in East Sussex, England

Coordinates: 50.8309°N 0.3512°E

Manxey Stream, looking east

Manxey Sewer is a 2.5-kilometre (1.6 mi) long stream (brook) and drainage ditch in the Pevensey Levels in Hailsham, in the Wealden District of East Sussex, England. Rising from Chilley Stream, Manxey Sewer flows an easterly course and flows underneath Warthing Road via a culvert before draining into Old Haven.
