= Salt Haven =

River in East Sussex, England

Coordinates: 50.8131°N 0.3583°E

The main outfall of Salt Haven, draining into the English Channel in Pevensey

Salt Haven is a minor river (brook) in the Wealden district of East Sussex, England. Rising from Pevensey Haven in Westham, Salt Haven drains into Pevensey Bay at the English Channel in Pevensey. The Pevensey Bridge Gate in Pevensey Haven just before Salt Haven determines the amount of water that can flow through.

== Course ==
Located in the Pevensey Levels, as Pevensey Haven reaches Westham and curves south, it becomes known as Salt Haven. Continuing its southerly course, Salt Haven receives the waters of Langley Sewer before flowing southeast, during which it receives the waters of Bill Gut. After reaching the settlement of Pevensey Bay, Salt Haven assumes an easterly course. It then flows north into the English Channel via three outfall pipes.
