= White Dyke Sewer =

River in East Sussex, England

Coordinates: 50.8500°N 0.2948°E

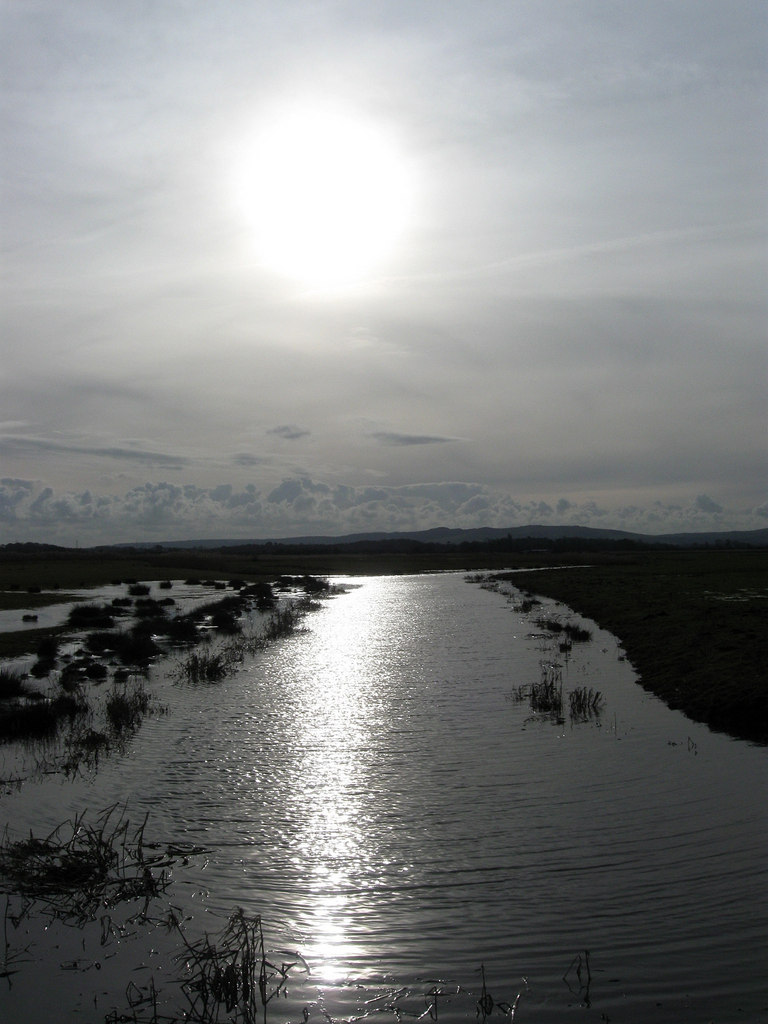
White Dyke Sewer, looking south

White Dyke Sewer, also known as simply White Dyke, is a 1.9-kilometre (1.2 mi) long stream (brook) and drainage ditch of the Pevensey Levels in Hailsham, Wealden District of East Sussex, England, that is a tributary to Horse Eye Sewer.

== Course ==
Rising from a drainage basin located in the White Dyke Marsh marshland, White Dyke Sewer flows northeasterly until reaching the confluence of Crossing Sewer and Lewens Sewer, when it turns southeast. White Dyke Sewer then resumes its northeasterly course, giving rise to Down Sewer, before finally flowing into Horse Eye Sewer.
