= Drove Sewer =

River in East Sussex, England

Coordinates: 50.8652°N 0.3003°E

Drove Sewer, looking northeast

Drove Sewer is a 1-kilometre (0.62 mi) long river (brook) and drainage ditch of the Pevensey Levels in the civil parish of Hailsham, Wealden District of East Sussex, England. It is a tributary to Rickney Sewer.

== Course ==
Drove Sewer rises from Whelpley Sewer (also known as Old Whelpley Sewer), and flows westerly alongside Whelpley Sewer to the north. It later turns south and briefly flows southeasterly. After resuming its southerly course, Drove Sewer finally flows into Rickney Sewer.
