= Drockmill Hill Gut =

River in East Sussex, England

Coordinates: 50.8390°N 0.2967°E

Drockmill Hill Gut near its confluence with Glynleigh Sewer

Drockmill Hill Gut is a 3.1-kilometre (1.9 mi) long river in the Wealden District of East Sussex, England, that is a tributary to Glynleigh Sewer. It is partly located in the Pevensey Levels.

== Course ==
Drockmill Hill Gut rises in the civil parish of Willingdon and Jevington and precedes to flow a northeasterly course. After reaching Hankham in the civil parish of Westham, Drockmill Hill Gut flows northerly before flowing underneath Glynleigh Road via a culvert. It then resumes its northeasterly course, meandering several times, before finally flowing into Glynleigh Sewer.
