= Railland Ditch =

River in East Sussex, England

Railland Ditch, looking east

Railland Ditch is a minor river—brook—and drainage ditch of the Pevensey Levels in Hailsham, Wealden District of East Sussex, England. It rises from Yotham river and flows an easterly course, before turning northward. It then flows into Kentland Sewer via a tributary stream before finally flowing into Kentland Fleet. Railland Ditch also gives rise to, and receives the waters of, several unnamed streams.

== Etymology ==
According to the Survey of English Place-Names, Railland Ditch was known as Reylond in the Valor Ecclesiasticus in 1535, Reyland Marsh in a deed in 1690, and Raylands Marsh in an unpublished work dated 1840. It states Rey is derived from Middle English ey (egg) and lond meaning "land".
