= Down Sewer =

River in East Sussex, England

Coordinates: 50.8410°N 0.3060°E

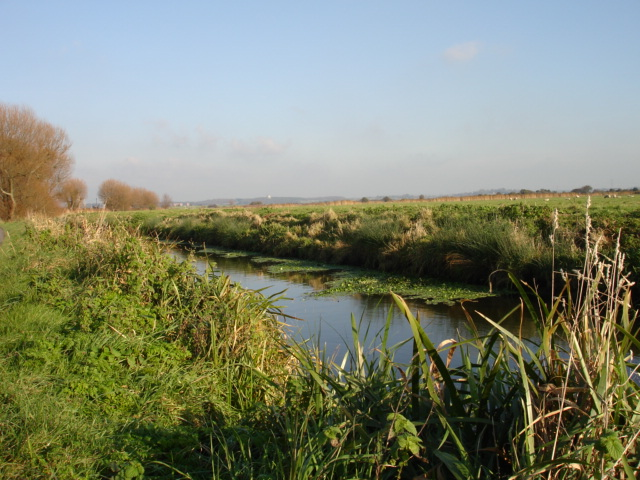
Down Sewer

Down Sewer is a 1.3-kilometre (0.81 mi) long river in the Wealden District of East Sussex, England, that is a tributary to Hurst Haven. Located in the Pevensey Levels, it rises from White Dyke Sewer and flows a southeasterly course.
