= Landscape history =

Study of changes in the physical environment caused by human activities

Landscape history is the study of the way in which humanity has changed the physical appearance of the environment – both present and past. It is sometimes referred to as landscape archaeology. It was first recognised as a separate area of study during the 20th century and uses evidence and approaches from other disciplines including archaeology, architecture, ecology, aerial photography, rephotography, local history and historical geography.

== Origin and scope ==
In England, landscape history emerged as an academic discipline following the publication of The Making of the English Landscape by W. G. Hoskins in 1955, although some topics that are now considered part of landscape history had been identified earlier. Darby, for example, gives many early examples of regional characterisation of landscapes.

Following Hoskins, landscape history expanded in various directions. There are published landscape histories of a number of English counties. Other authors have studied the landscape at earlier periods. One productive avenue has been the study of specific landscape features such as fields, villages, and so on. Managed woodland has been extensively studied by Oliver Rackham.

The scope of landscape history ranges from specific individual features to areas covering hundreds of square miles. Topics studied by landscape historians include:

- the form (morphology) of settlements – for example whether they are dispersed or nucleated;
- the status of settlements – for example Anglo-Saxon multiple estates;
- deserted medieval villages which provide evidence of earlier village forms;
- field systems which can be used to date landscape features as well as illuminating earlier landscapes;
- field boundaries or boundaries of larger units such as parishes or counties;
- place-names which have been used to illustrate landscape features, particularly Anglo-Saxon place-names.

== Techniques ==
Two complementary approaches can be used to study landscape history – fieldwork and desk research. Fieldwork involves physical inspection of the landscape to identify earthworks and other potential features. Documentary desk research involves finding references to landscape features in primary and secondary sources. Among the most useful documentary sources are maps. Modern aerial photographs are useful for identifying large-scale features; earlier aerial photographs may show features that have now been lost.

The origin of features can often be related to the geology and ecology of the area being studied – for example the importance of springs and the suitability of the soil for different forms of agriculture.

The presence of indicator species can be used to identify previous land use, for example bluebells suggesting ancient woodland, particularly in the East of England and Lincolnshire.

Landscape features can also indicate earlier land usage. For example, a red hill in a coastal area is an indication of salt production.

The historic landscape characterisation programme initiated by English Heritage provides a framework for standardising and recording information about landscape history, particularly to support the planning authorities.

== Academic status ==
Few universities have a department of landscape history. Academic landscape historians are typically found within departments of archaeology, history, local history or continuing education. For example, Nick Higham at Manchester has the title Professor in Early Medieval and Landscape History in the school of history. Landscape history courses are typically post-graduate or extra mural. As a result, much of the work in landscape history is undertaken by amateurs (although often supervised by professionals in landscape studies).

== Journals ==
Landscape History is the name of a refereed journal published by the Society for Landscape Studies.
