= Landscapes of England =

1976 British television documentary series

- Presented by: W.G. Hoskins
- Country of origin: United Kingdom
- No. of episodes: 12

Production
- Producer: Peter Jones
- Running time: 25 min

Original release
- Network: BBC2
- Release: 16 January 1976 – 14 June 1978

Landscapes of England: An Exploration with W.G. Hoskins is a BBC television documentary series broadcast on BBC2 in 1976 and 1978. Written and presented by Professor W.G. Hoskins, the series was a televisual accompaniment to his seminal text The Making of the English Landscape (1955), examining how human influence has greatly shaped the landscape of distinct regions in England.

Hoskins's book The Making of the English Landscape had formed the basis of a fifty-minute Horizon episode broadcast in 1972 presented by Hoskins and produced by Peter Jones. Many of the same crew returned for Landscapes of England, which focussed on individual landscapes within England.

Two series of six episodes were produced. Joan Thirsk characterises his presentation of the series as "standing out in all weathers, rubicund, benign, usually smiling, though he was once ankle deep in river water." Professor Hoskins also wrote two accompanying books; English Landscapes (ISBN 978-0563173991) and a series of essays One Man's England (ISBN 978-0563175193) derived from the twelve programmes. Both series were released on DVD by Simply Media in 2019 with the earlier Horizon episode as an extra.

== Episode list ==
=== Series 1 ===
Episode No.	Episode Title	UK Broadcast Date	Description
1	"Ancient Dorset"	16 January 1976	Professor Hoskins explores the heaths, valleys and villages of Dorset.
2	"Conquest of the Mountains"	23 January 1976	An exploration of the wilderness of the Lake District, looking into how the mountains, tarns and fells, far from being a natural landscape, were shaped by man.
3	"Marsh and Sea"	30 January 1976	On the north coast of Norfolk, W. G. Hoskins details how deserted ports and isolated churches speaks of the communities' former prosperity and a centuries-old battle between land and sea.
4	"Landscapes of Peace and War"	6 February 1976	The apparently peaceful hopfields and orchards of Kent reveal its secret as a former industrial landscape formerly used to construct Tudor armaments.
5	"Black Country"	13 February 1976	How the industrial landscape of the Black Country in Staffordshire has been exploited since the Middle Ages.
6	"The Deserted Midlands"	20 February 1976	From Upper Thames to Banbury, Professor Hoskins highlights a countryside which has been untouched for centuries.

=== Series 2 ===
Episode No.	Episode Title	UK Broadcast Date	Description
1	"Behind the Scenery"	3 May 1978	Seeing past its touristy beauty, Professor Hoskins looks at how the landscape of Cornwall is shaped by granite, the sea and the independence of its people. In this episode Professor Hopkins reveals the location he desired for his "appointed time" (an old quarry).
2	"The Fox and the Covert"	10 May 1978	How fox hunting shaped the countryside of Rutland and Leicestershire in central England.
3	"No Stone Unturned"	17 May 1978	Examines how two distinct industries played a vital role in creating the landscape of the Peak District in Derbyshire.
4	"The Frontier"	24 May 1978	From Roman times, skirmishes between England and Scotland have left the border landscape of Northumberland indelibly marked.
5	"Breckland and Broads"	7 June 1978	How a cold climate, the need for fuel, and man-made disasters of wind and water have played their part in the making of Norfolk Broads and England's only desert; Breckland.
6	"Landscape of Ancient Peace"	14 June 1978	Professor Hoskins talks passionately about his home county of Devon, eulogising its isolated farms and churches; villages and towns and the ancient city of Exeter.
