= Magham Down Manor House =

- Interactive map of Magham Down Manor House
- 50.8837°N 0.2897°E
- Location: Magham Down, East Sussex, England

History
- Built: 17th century or earlier

Listed Building – Grade II
- Designated: 12 August 1981
- Reference no.: 1353325

Magham Down Manor House is a Grade II listed building in Magham Down in the Wealden district of East Sussex.
