= Pevensey Haven =

River in East Sussex, England

Coordinates: 50°49′09″N 0°20′28″E

Pevensey Haven

Pevensey Haven is a 6.1-kilometre (3.8 mi) long river in the Pevensey Levels in the Wealden district of East Sussex, England, that is a tributary to Salt Haven in the civil parish of Westham.

== Course ==
Pevensey Haven rises at the confluence of two smaller streams in the neighbourhood of Rickney (BN27)—Hurst Haven to the northeast, and Glynleigh Sewer to the west. Pevensey Haven flows a southerly course before turning east; after it receives the waters of Chilley Stream (east), it commences a southeasterly course into the civil parish of Pevensey. Pevensey Haven then turns south and flows underneath the Pevensey Bypass section of the A27 road via a culvert, where it receives the waters of Old Haven. When Pevensey Haven reaches Westham, it curves east to become known as Salt Haven.

== Water quality ==
Water quality of the river in 2019, according to the Environment Agency, a non-departmental public body sponsored by the United Kingdom's Department for Environment, Food and Rural Affairs:

Ecological Status	Chemical Status	Length	Catchment
Moderate	Fail	6.181 km (3.841 mi)	36.708 km^{2} (14.173 sq mi)
