= Hurst Haven =

River in East Sussex, England

Coordinates: 50.8389°N 0.3095°E

Hurst Haven at the Pevensey Levels

Hurst Haven is a 10.2-kilometre (6.3 mi) long river in Hailsham, Wealden District, East Sussex, England. Located partly in the Pevensey Levels, Hurst Haven joins Glynleigh Sewer to form the Pevensey Haven.

== Course ==
Hurst Haven rises in a forest south of Cinderford Lane and flows a southerly course. Turning southwesterly around the neighbourhood of Carters Corner, Hurst Haven flows a southeasterly course into the Pevensey Levels just west of the village of Magham Down. After receiving the waters of Iron Stream, Hurst Haven turns south before curving west and receiving the waters of Down Sewer and Horse Eye Sewer before joining Glynleigh Sewer to form the Pevensey Haven.

== Water quality ==
Water quality of the river in 2019, according to the Environment Agency, a non-departmental public body sponsored by the United Kingdom's Department for Environment, Food and Rural Affairs:

Ecological Status	Chemical Status	Length	Catchment
Moderate	Fail	10.272 km (6.383 mi)	17.084 km^{2} (6.596 sq mi)
