= Boundaries in landscape history =

Boundaries—particularly field boundaries—are among the oldest features in an English rural landscape. Although a boundary itself is an abstract concept, the boundary can often be seen by differences in land use on either side.

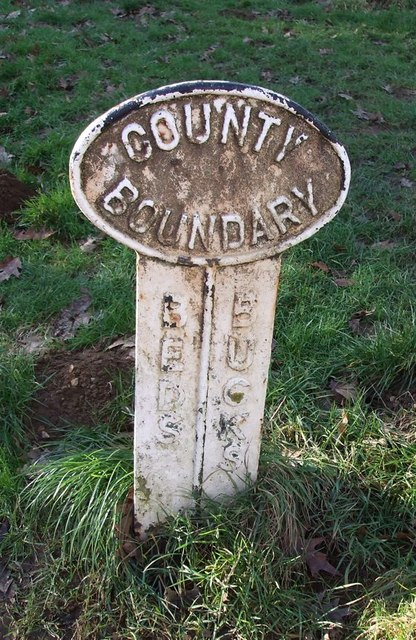
Beds Bucks Boundary Post

== Longevity of boundaries ==
Boundaries - a real or imagined line that marks the limit of something. Many field boundaries in the central region of England originated with the enclosure of the previous open fields in the 18th or 19th century. In a few instances, current field boundaries (particularly in the West Country) have been shown to have originated in the Bronze Age or Iron Age. With a few exceptions, however, the attempt to establish pre-Saxon boundaries has been "largely fruitless". Areas that were never formally enclosed might yet prove a more fruitful area of research.

== Hedgerow dating ==
The presence of bluebells in a hedge is often an indicator of an early hedge. It has been proposed that boundary hedges can be dated by hedgerow dating. This involves counting the number of species in a 27-metre section of hedge. In its simplest form each separate species suggests an age of 100 years. A variety of additional complexities have been suggested, but results have been mixed and the technique remains controversial.

== Parish boundaries ==
Parish boundaries are of particular interest to landscape historians, since they are often inherited from land holdings that date back to the middle Saxon period or earlier. The coincidence of another landscape feature with a parish boundary can be used to date that feature—for example in the Time Team episode screened on 11 March 2007, a mill leat was determined to pre-date the Norman conquest because it coincided with a parish boundary.

The boundaries of a few Anglo-Saxon estates were described in the boundary clauses of Anglo-Saxon Charters. These boundary clauses can sometimes be used to characterise the landscape at the time. In some cases, it has been possible to show that the boundaries of these Anglo-Saxon estates correspond to the boundaries of the subsequent parish.

Parish boundaries are shown on the old "1 inch" Ordnance Survey maps, although these are the boundaries of the civil parish which may be different. Parish boundaries are not shown on the modern "Landranger" maps. Tithe maps, from the early 19th century, usually show the parish boundary at the time they were drawn.

=== Beating the Bounds ===
A long tradition exists in England of 'Beating the Bounds', either an annual or seven-yearly event, wherein parishioners would walk the bounds of the parish. The event was deliberately organised to make it as memorable as possible, and to hand-down an intergenerational memory of the precise boundaries. For civil parishes, the ceremony may have begun with the Poor Relief Act 1601, or much older for the 'Processioning' of churches, dating from Anglo-Saxon times. Older parishioners, and local officials, would walk the route as accurately as possible, pointing out all the various landmarks and boundary markers along the way, both natural and deliberate artefacts. A distinctive feature of these perambulations was the performance of peculiar rituals with the youngest walkers, in order to make particular points memorable. These could include being passed through the window of a local pub, rather than walking through the door, being carried across a stream, or being hung upside down by the ankles and their head 'bumped' on the grass.

Such processions fell from practice in the Modernism of the mid-20th century, but there was some interest in their revival from the 1960s. Several were re-enacted after a break of as many as 21 years.

== March dyke ==
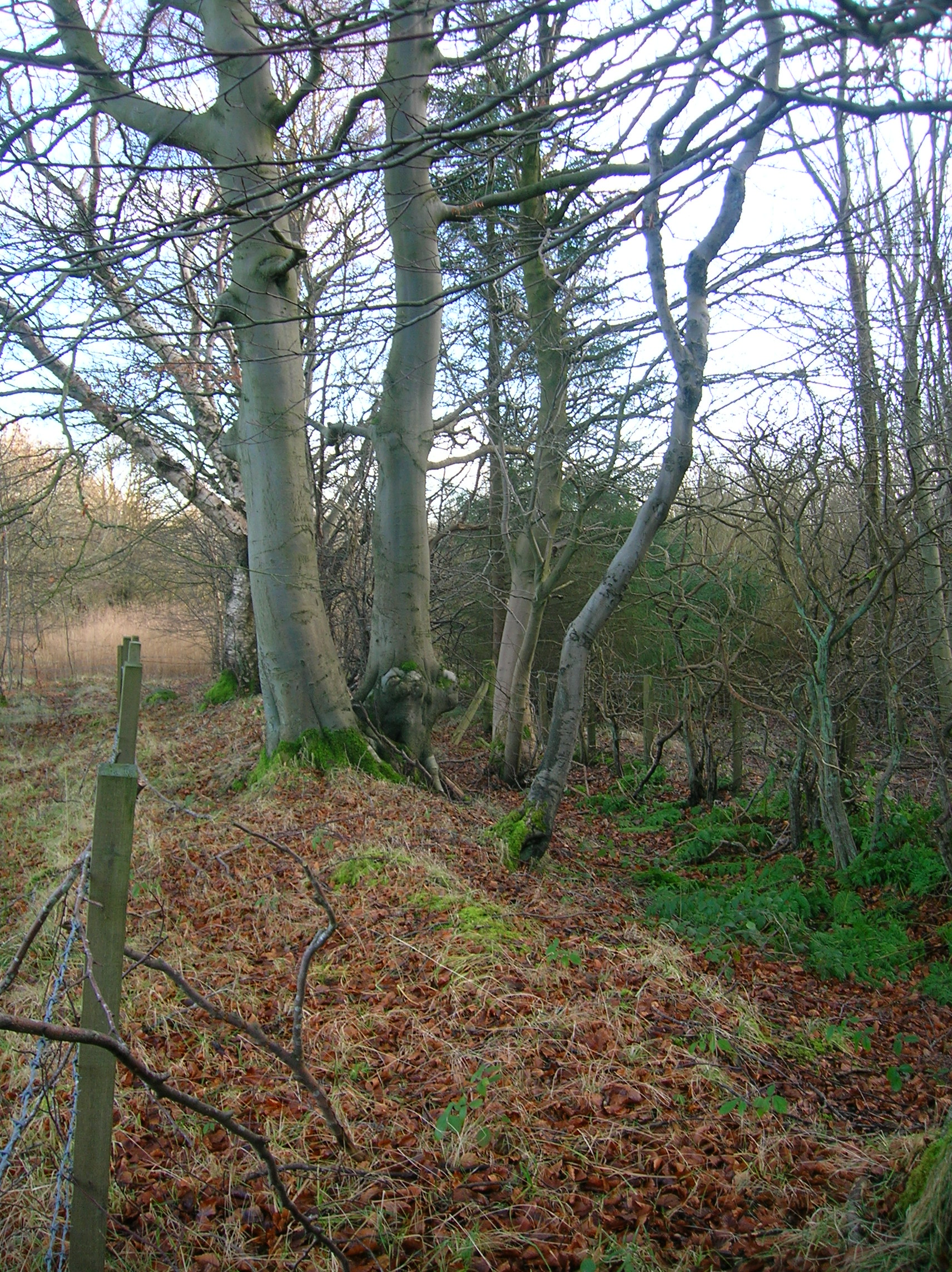
The old march dyke between the baronies of Eglinton and Stone in North Ayrshire.

In Scotland a march dyke is the boundary between farms or previously baronies.

== Deer park boundaries ==
The boundaries of medieval deer parks are often marked by pronounced earthworks and for early parks, they can coincide with parish boundaries.

== Former boundaries ==
Boundaries that have fallen out of use, may still be traceable by using geophysics or as a result of earthworks (lumps and bumps) or cropmarks. Cropmarks and earthworks are often visible in aerial photographs. Earthworks are more easily seen on photographs taken when the sun is low in the sky and as a result, shadows are more pronounced. They can also become more easily seen when the ground has a slight dusting of snow.
