= Horse Eye Sewer =

River in East Sussex, England

Coordinates: 50.8450°N 0.3144°E

Horse Eye Sewer in Hailsham

Horse Eye Sewer is a small, 4.8-kilometre (3.0 mi) long stream (brook) of the Pevensey Levels in the Wealden District of East Sussex, England. A tributary to Hurst Haven, Horse Eye Sewer acts as a drainage ditch for several minor streams, many of which are unnamed.

== Course ==
Rising in the civil parish of Hailsham, Horse Eye Sewer rises south of Old Swan Lane just outside of the Pevensey Levels Site of Special Scientific Interest (SSSI), and flows an easterly course into the Pevensey Levels. It then turns southeast before assuming a northeasterly course, flowing past White Dyke Farm and receiving the waters of White Dyke Sewer. After reaching Pevensey, Horse Eye Sewer turns south before assuming a southeasterly course to receive the waters of Rickney Sewer. Horse Eye Sewer continues this course until finally draining into Hurst Haven.

== Water quality ==
The following table gives the water quality of the river in 2019, according to the Environment Agency, a non-departmental public body sponsored by the United Kingdom's Department for Environment, Food and Rural Affairs. The reason for its chemical failure was because of the presence of benzo(ghi)perylene, mercury, perfluorooctanesulfonic acid and polybrominated diphenyl ethers in its waters.

| Ecological Status | Chemical Status | Length | Catchment |
|---|---|---|---|
| Moderate | Fail | 4.801 km (2.983 mi) | 9.543 km^{2} (3.685 sq mi) |

In 2016, the Environment Agency had declared that Horse Eye Sewer was a "species poor site" due to the lack of fauna in its waters.
