= W. G. Hoskins =

English local historian (1908–1992)

W. G. Hoskins CBE FBA
- Hoskins in an English landscape
- Born: William George Hoskins; 22 May 1908; Exeter, Devon, England
- Died: 11 January 1992 (aged 83); Cullompton, Devon, England
- Occupation: Historian
- Known for: The Making of the English Landscape (1955)
- Title: Hatton Professor of English History
- Spouse: Jane

Academic background
- Education: Hele's School
- Alma mater: University College of South West England

Academic work
- Discipline: History
- Sub-discipline: Landscape history; English local history; Economic history; History of Devon
- Institutions: University College, Leicester; University of Oxford

William George Hoskins CBE FBA (22 May 1908 – 11 January 1992) was an English local historian who founded the first university department of English Local History. His great contribution to the study of history was in the field of landscape history.

Hoskins demonstrated the profound impact of human activity on the evolution of the English landscape in a pioneering book: The Making of the English Landscape. His work has had lasting influence in the fields of local and landscape history and historical and environmental conservation.

== Life ==
William George Hoskins was born at 26–28 St David's Hill, Exeter, Devon on 22 May 1908: his father, like his grandfather, was a baker.

He won a scholarship to Hele's School in 1918, and attended the University College of South West England where he gained BSc and MSc degrees in economics by the age of 21. Both his MSc in 1929 and his PhD in 1938 were on the history of Devon.

The remainder of his life was devoted to university teaching and the authorship of historical works. He died on 11 January 1992 in Cullompton, Devon.

== Academic career ==
Hoskins was appointed Assistant Lecturer in Commerce at University College, Leicester in 1931. He found the trade statistics to be dull lecture material, but he enjoyed the evenings that he spent teaching archaeology and local history at Vaughan College. His academic researches covered historical demography, urban history, agrarian history, the evolution of vernacular architecture, landscape history and local history. He became a member of the Leicestershire Archaeological Society in September 1935.

After the award of his doctorate Hoskins was appointed Reader in English Local History at University College, Leicester (1938).

In 1952, Hoskins resigned from his posts at University College, Leicester, and on the Leicestershire Victoria County History Committee to become Reader in Economic History in the University of Oxford. In his obituary, this was stated to be generally acknowledged as a mistake.

== The Making of the English Landscape ==
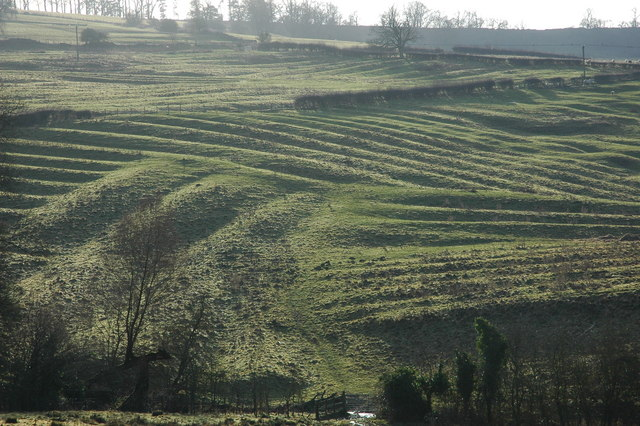
In The Making of the English Landscape, Hoskins explains features like the distinctive ridge and furrow pattern in open field system farming, seen here at Wood Stanway, Gloucestershire.

In 1955, Hoskins published the book that was to make his name. The Making of the English Landscape is a landscape history of England and a seminal text in that discipline and in local history. The brief history of some one thousand years has become a standard text in local and environmental history courses. Hoskins sets out his stall in the introduction with "No book exists to describe the manner in which the various landscapes of this country came to assume the shape and appearance they now have...". The brief concluding chapter contains only one image, Plate 82, "The completed English landscape" showing a tall tree in a wide open field, a strip of hedges and villages just visible in the distance. The chapter laments the damage caused to parts of the English landscape, mentioning bulldozers and tractors, nuclear bombers and by-passes, and ends by celebrating again the wealth of detail within a few hundred yards of Hoskins' study window at Steeple Barton.

The book has been well received by critics. Penelope Lively describes the book as "a marvellous, robust, opinionated account of the landscape as narrative". William Boyd describes it as "an absolute trailblazer, a revolution." Boyd notes that W. H. Auden "revered" the book, and that reading Hoskins had enabled him to "read" a landscape as a "historical palimpsest". Local historian Graeme White calls the book "brilliantly-crafted".

== Later career and television work ==
Hoskins was one of the founders of the Exeter Group in 1960 (later to become the Exeter Civic Society). He was president of the Dartmoor Preservation Association from 1962 until 1976.

He became the first professor of local history at the University of Leicester in 1965 when he was appointed Hatton Professor of English History. He retired in 1968.

Following his retirement, Hoskins presented an episode of Horizon based on The Making of the English Landscape in 1972.

This led to a BBC television series Landscapes of England which examined in more detail how human influence has greatly shaped the landscape of twelve distinct regions in England, the first series in 1976 and the second in 1978. For the final episode, Hoskins talks passionately about his home county of Devon and his home city of Exeter.

== Honours and memorials ==
Hoskins was awarded the Fellowship of the British Academy in 1969 and the CBE in 1971. He was made an Honorary Fellow of the Royal Institute of British Architects in 1973, and received the Murchison Award of the Royal Geographical Society in 1976.

The University of Exeter acknowledged his links with the city by conferring an honorary Doctorate of Letters upon him in 1974.

As founder of the Department of English Local History (now the Centre for English Local History) at the University of Leicester, his achievements are commemorated by the Friends of the Centre for English Local History each year in the annual W. G. Hoskins lecture, and another at St Anne's College, Oxford.

In 2004 the Devon History Society erected a blue plaque on his birthplace in Exeter with the inscription: "W. G. Hoskins CBE FBA Dlitt 1908–1992 Historian of Devon, Exeter and the English Landscape Born Here 'Hic Amor, Haec Patria Est'."

== Works ==
Hoskins wrote the following books and essays:

- The Face of Britain. Midland England: A Survey of the Country Between the Midlands and the Trent (London & New York: B.T. Batsford, 1949)
- East Midlands and the Peak (London: Festival of Britain Office/Collins, 1951)
- Chilterns to Black Country (London: Festival of Britain Office/Collins, 1951)
- (with Finberg, H. P. R.) Devonshire Studies (London: Jonathan Cape, 1952)
- A New Survey of England: Devon, (London: Collins, February 1954; New edition David & Charles, June 1972)
- The Making of the English Landscape (Leicester, 1955) ISBN 0-340-77020-1, new edition Little Toller Books (2013)
- Leicestershire: an illustrated essay on the history of the landscape. (London: Hodder & Stoughton, 1957)
- The Midland Peasant: The economic and social history of a Leicestershire village (1957)
- Local History in England (Harlow: Longman, 1959; 2nd edition 1972; 3rd edition 1984) ISBN 0-582-48286-0
- Devon and its People, (Exeter: A. Wheaton, 1959) ISBN 0-7153-4865-5
- Two Thousand Years in Exeter, (Exeter: James Townsend, 1960) ISBN 1-86077-303-6
- "Foreword" in West, John. Village Records (London: Macmillan; New York: St. Martin's Press, 1962) ISBN 0-85033-444-6
- (with Stamp, L. Dudley) The Common Lands of England and Wales (London: Collins, 1963)
- English Local History: the Past and the Future, An inaugural lecture (Leicester, 1966)
- Old Devon (London: David & Charles, 1966) ISBN 0-7153-4049-2
- Fieldwork in Local History (London: Faber & Faber, 1967) ISBN 0-571-18051-5
- (as editor) History from the Farm (London: Faber & Faber, 1970) ISBN 0-571-09437-6
- Exeter Militia List 1803 (Chichester: Phillimore, 1972)
- The Age of Plunder: The England of Henry VIII 1500–1547 (London, 1976) ISBN 0-582-48544-4
- English Landscapes (London: BBC, 1979) ISBN 0-563-17399-8
- Devon (Tiverton: Devon, 1992) ISBN 1-86077-204-8
- Trade and People in Exeter 1688–1800

== See also ==
- Francis Pryor, author of The Making of the British Landscape

== Sources ==
- Fox, Harold. 'Plaque commemorates birthplace of eminent historian', E-Bulletin: University of Leicester 16 February 2004 Retrieved 12 May 2005
- Pugh, R .B. (1954). Hoskins, W. G.; McKinley, R.A. (eds.). Editorial Note. Victoria County History. pp. xiii–xiv.
- Thirsk, Joan (2008) [2004]. "Hoskins, William George (1908–1992)". Oxford Dictionary of National Biography (online ed.). Oxford University Press. doi:10.1093/ref:odnb/38631. (Subscription, Wikipedia Library access or UK public library membership required.)
- Wykes, David L. (1992). "Obituaries: Professor William George Hoskins" (PDF). Transactions of the Leicestershire Archaeological and Historical Society. 66: 168–171.
