= Doug Tushingham =

Arlotte Douglas Tushingham (1914 – February 27, 2002) was a Canadian archaeologist most noted for his excavations of Jericho with Kathleen Kenyon.

== Selected works ==
- Tushingham, A. D. (1985). "Kathleen Mary Kenyon (1906 –1978)" (PDF). Proceedings of the British Academy. 71: 555–582.
