= Magham Down =

Village in East Sussex, England

Coordinates: 50.88122°N 0.28524°E

Magham Down is a village between Herstmonceux and Hailsham in the Wealden district of East Sussex. It lies on the A271 road. It has a Grade II listed building, Magham Down Manor House.

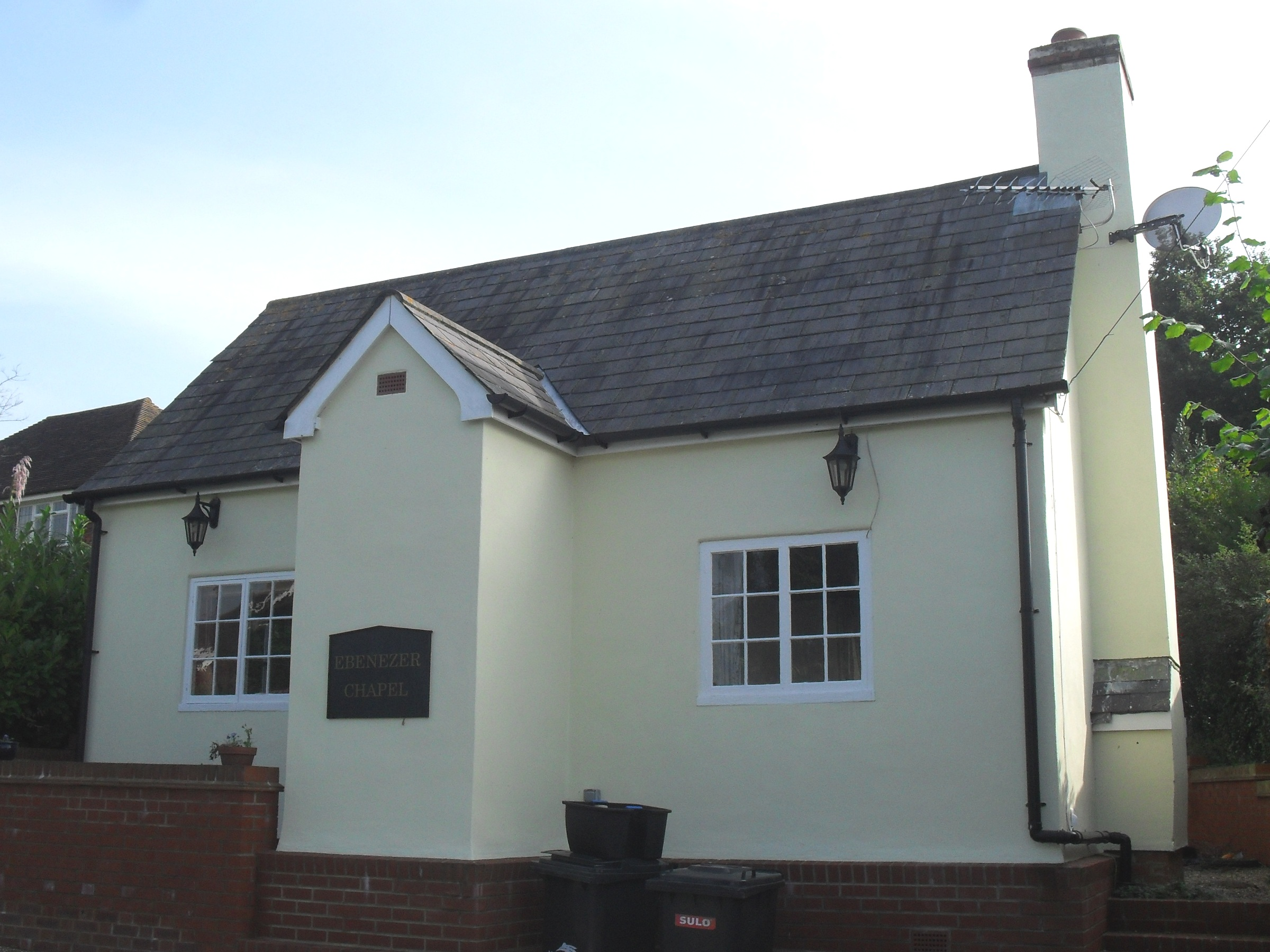
Former Ebenezer Strict Baptist Chapel, Magham Down, now a private residence

Historically, Magham Down was at the point to the east of the market town of Hailsham where the road forked, one route heading towards Battle and Hastings, the other leading towards Herstmonceux castle. In the eighteenth century the roads at Magham Down were remodelled with a new road cut to provide a more direct route towards Battle. The cut became known as New Road while the original route became Old Road. The road towards Herstmonceux castle remains as Under Road. Most of the dwellings in Magham Down are along Old Road and Squab Lane but the small commercial area was located where the two eastward roads forked where there was once a blacksmith's forge. In the twentieth century Magham Down reached its commercial peak, still small, but it did include a motor garage, the Red Lion pub, a guest house and a village shop and post office. In due course the garage and the Guest House became the Old Forge Hotel but by the end of the century the Red Lion pub and the village shop had closed.
