= Pevensey Levels =

Site of Special Scientific Interest in East Sussex

Coordinates: 50.844°N 0.338°E

- Site of Special Scientific Interest
- Location of Pevensey Levels.
- Area of search: East Sussex
- Grid reference: TQ 647 076
- Interest: Biological
- Area: 3,603.2 hectares (8,904 acres)
- Notification date: 1990
- Location map: Magic Map

Pevensey Levels is a 3,603.2-hectare (8,904-acre) biological Site of Special Scientific Interest between Bexhill-on-Sea and Hailsham in East Sussex. It is a Nature Conservation Review site, Grade I, a Ramsar site and a Special Area of Conservation. An area of 183.5 hectares (453 acres) is a national nature reserve and an area of 150 hectares (370 acres) is a nature reserve called Pevensey Marshes which is managed by the Sussex Wildlife Trust.

This is a large area of wetland grazing meadows intersected by a network of ditches. It has many nationally rare invertebrates. It may be the best site in Britain for freshwater mollusc fauna, including the endangered shining ram's-horn snail. It also has one nationally rare and several nationally scarce aquatic plants and it is of national importance for lapwing, with more than 1% of the British population.
