= Pevensey Castle =

Castle in East Sussex, England

- Pevensey, East Sussex
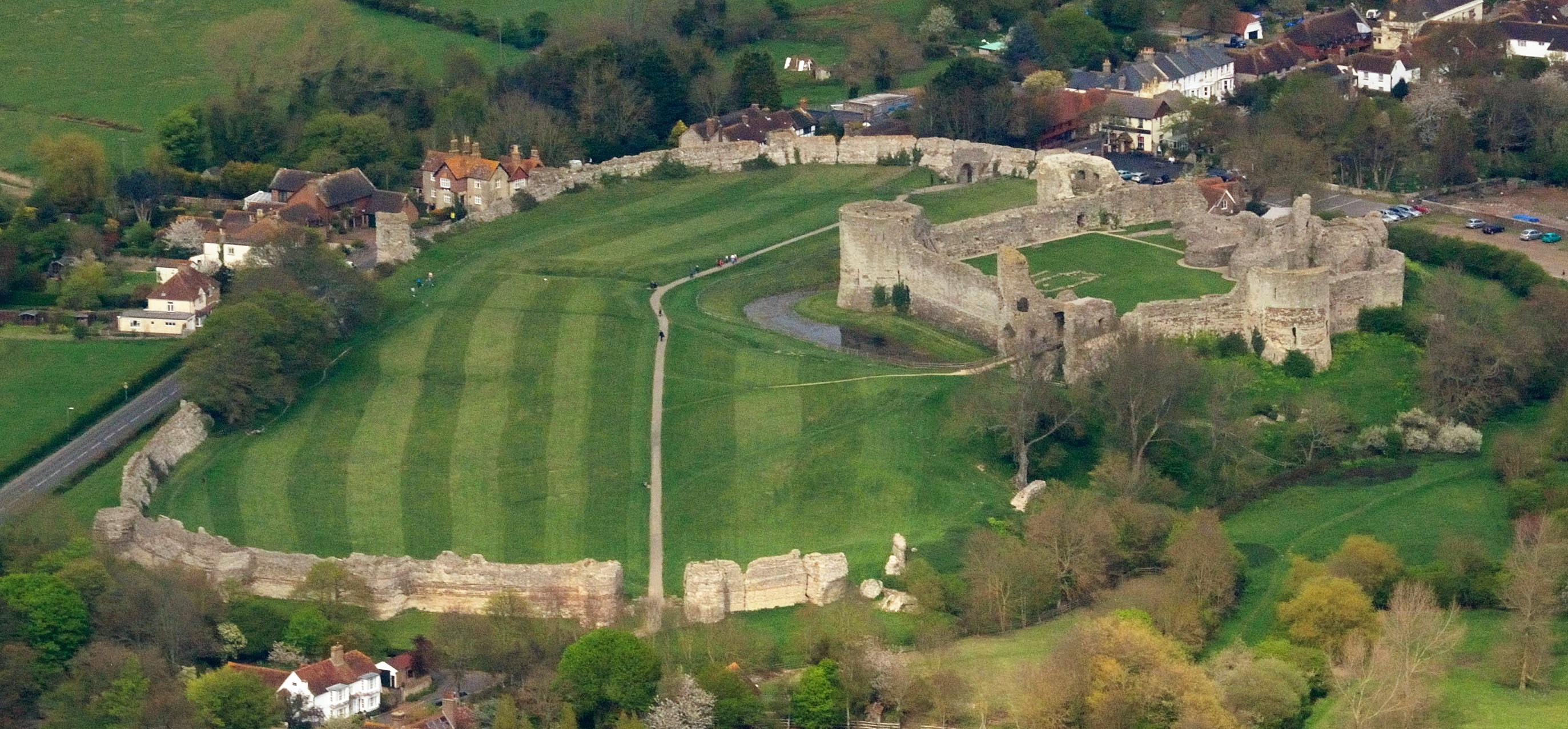
- Aerial view of Pevensey Castle, showing the Norman keep and bailey at right within the Roman curtain wall; its main gate is at front

Site information
- Type: Castle
- Controlled by: English Heritage
- Condition: Ruin

Location
- Shown within East Sussex
- Coordinates: 50.8188°N 0.3342°E
- Grid reference: grid reference TQ644048
- Height: ~9.5 metres (31 ft) (outer walls)

Site history
- Built: c. 290 AD
- Built by: Carausius?
- In use: c. 290–471/491, 1066 – mid-16th century, 1940–1945
- Materials: Wood, cement, flint, chalk, ironstone, greensand, sandstone
- Battles/wars: Massacre of 491; First Siege of Pevensey (1088); Second Siege of Pevensey (1147); Third Siege of Pevensey (1264–65); Fourth Siege of Pevensey (1399); Second World War (1939–1945)
- Events: Built by Romans (c. 290), reoccupied by Normans (1066), slighted (c. 1216), abandoned (16th century), state ownership (1925), reoccupied by Allies (1940–45)

Garrison information
- Garrison: Classis Anderidaensis, Abulci (Roman era), Norman & English forces (medieval era), Home Guard, British Army, Canadian Army, U.S. Army Air Corps (1940–45)

Pevensey Castle is a medieval castle and former Roman Saxon Shore fort at Pevensey in the English county of East Sussex. The site is a scheduled monument in the care of English Heritage and is open to visitors. Built around 290 AD and known to the Romans as Anderitum, the fort appears to have been the base for a fleet called the Classis Anderidaensis. The reasons for its construction are unclear; long thought to have been part of a Roman defensive system to guard the British and Gallic coasts against Saxon pirates, it has more recently been suggested that Anderitum and the other Saxon Shore forts were built by a usurper in an ultimately unsuccessful attempt to prevent Rome from reimposing its control over Britain.

Anderitum fell into ruin following the end of the Roman occupation but was reoccupied in 1066 by the Normans, for whom it became a key strategic bulwark. A stone keep and fortification was built within the Roman walls and faced several sieges. Although its garrison was twice starved into surrender, it was never successfully stormed. The castle was occupied more or less continuously until the 16th century, apart from a possible break in the early 13th century when it was slighted during the First Barons' War. It had been abandoned again by the late 16th century and remained a crumbling, partly overgrown ruin until it was acquired by the state in 1925.

Pevensey Castle was reoccupied between 1940 and 1945, during the Second World War, when it was garrisoned by units from the Home Guard, the British and Canadian armies and the United States Army Air Corps. Machine-gun posts were built into the Roman and medieval walls to control the flat land around Pevensey and guard against the threat of a German invasion. They were left in place after the war and can still be seen today. Pevensey is one of many Norman castles built around the south of England.

== Location and dimensions ==
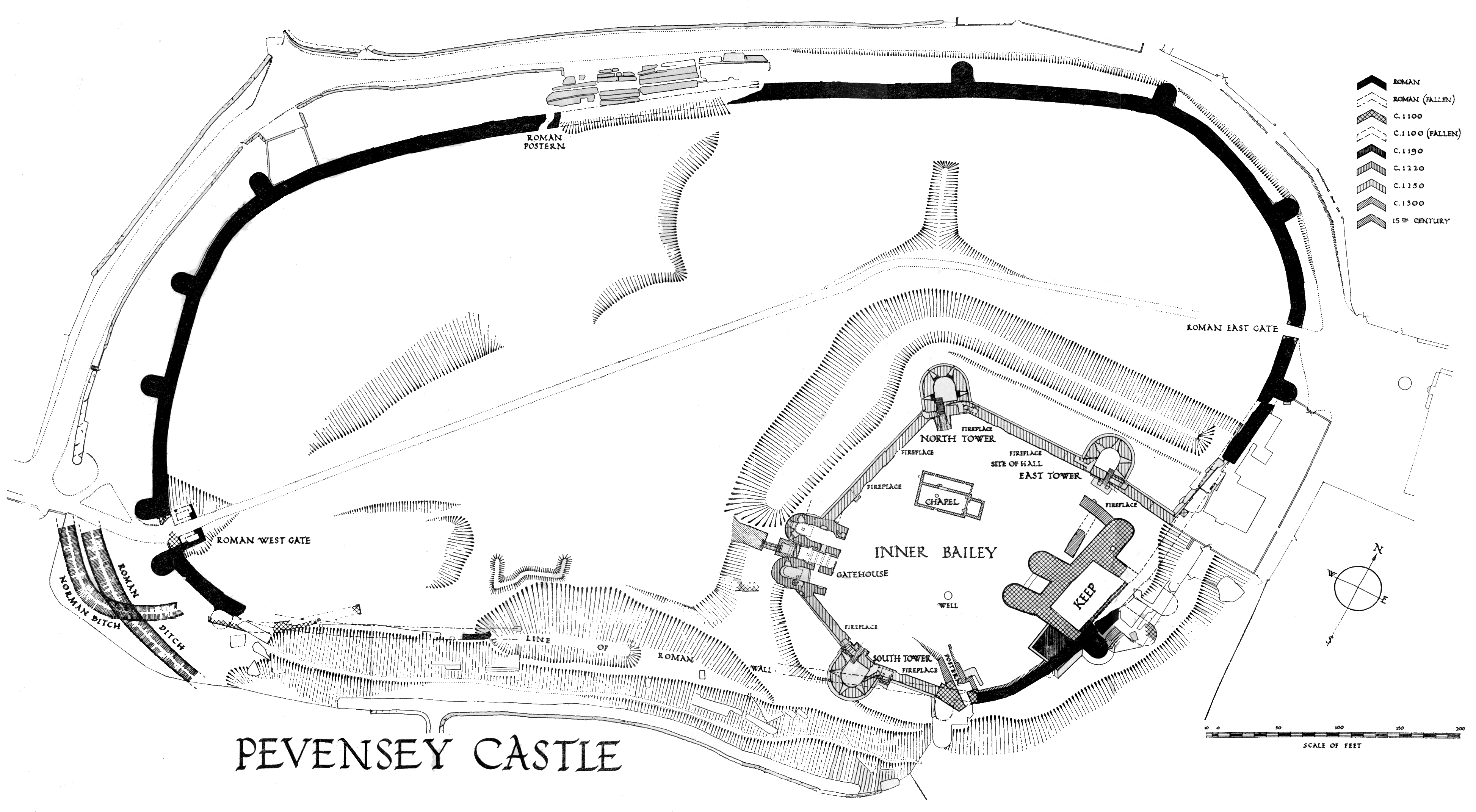
Plan of Pevensey Castle, showing that the south wall has been washed away by the sea.

Pevensey Castle was constructed by the Romans on a spur of sand and clay that stands about 10 metres (33 ft) above sea level. In Roman times this spur was a peninsula that projected into a tidal lagoon and marshes, making it a strong natural defensive position. A harbour is thought to have been situated near the south wall of the castle, sheltered by a long spit of shingle where the village of Pevensey Bay stands now. A small river, Pevensey Haven, runs along the north side of the peninsula and would originally have discharged into the lagoon, but is now largely silted up.

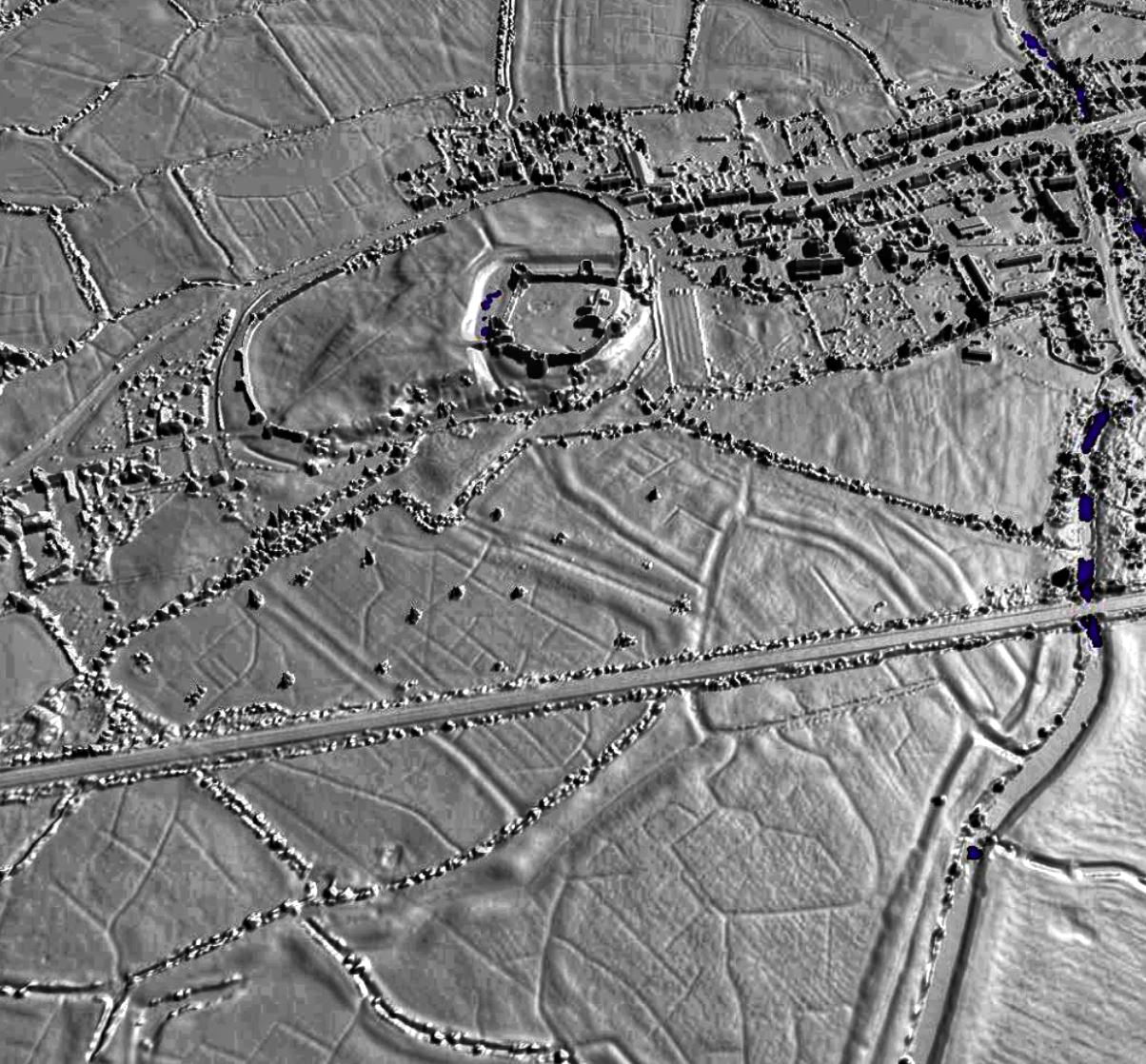
A lidar view of the castle and its surroundings

Since Roman times, silting and land reclamation in the Pevensey Levels have pushed the coastline out by about 1.5 kilometres (0.9 mi), leaving the castle landlocked. The land between the castle and the sea is now a flat marshland drained by a network of ditches and sewers or field drains. The modern village of Pevensey is situated mostly to the east of the castle, at the end of the ancient peninsula. Castle Road (the B2191) curves around the Roman north wall and connects Pevensey to the nearby village of Westham. A public footpath crosses the interior of the castle, linking the two villages. An area of reclaimed land, formerly part of the Pevensey tidal lagoon but now marshland and fields crossed by the Eastbourne to Hastings railway line, is situated immediately to the south of the castle.

The castle occupies an area of about 3.67 hectares (9.1 acres). It has an oval plan on a north-east/south-west alignment, measuring 290 metres (950 ft) by 170 metres (560 ft). Not only is it the largest of the nine Saxon Shore forts, but its walls and towers are the largest of any surviving Roman fort of the period. Its shape is unique among Saxon Shore forts and was presumably determined by the contours of the peninsula on which it stands.

== Architecture ==
=== Curtain wall and towers ===
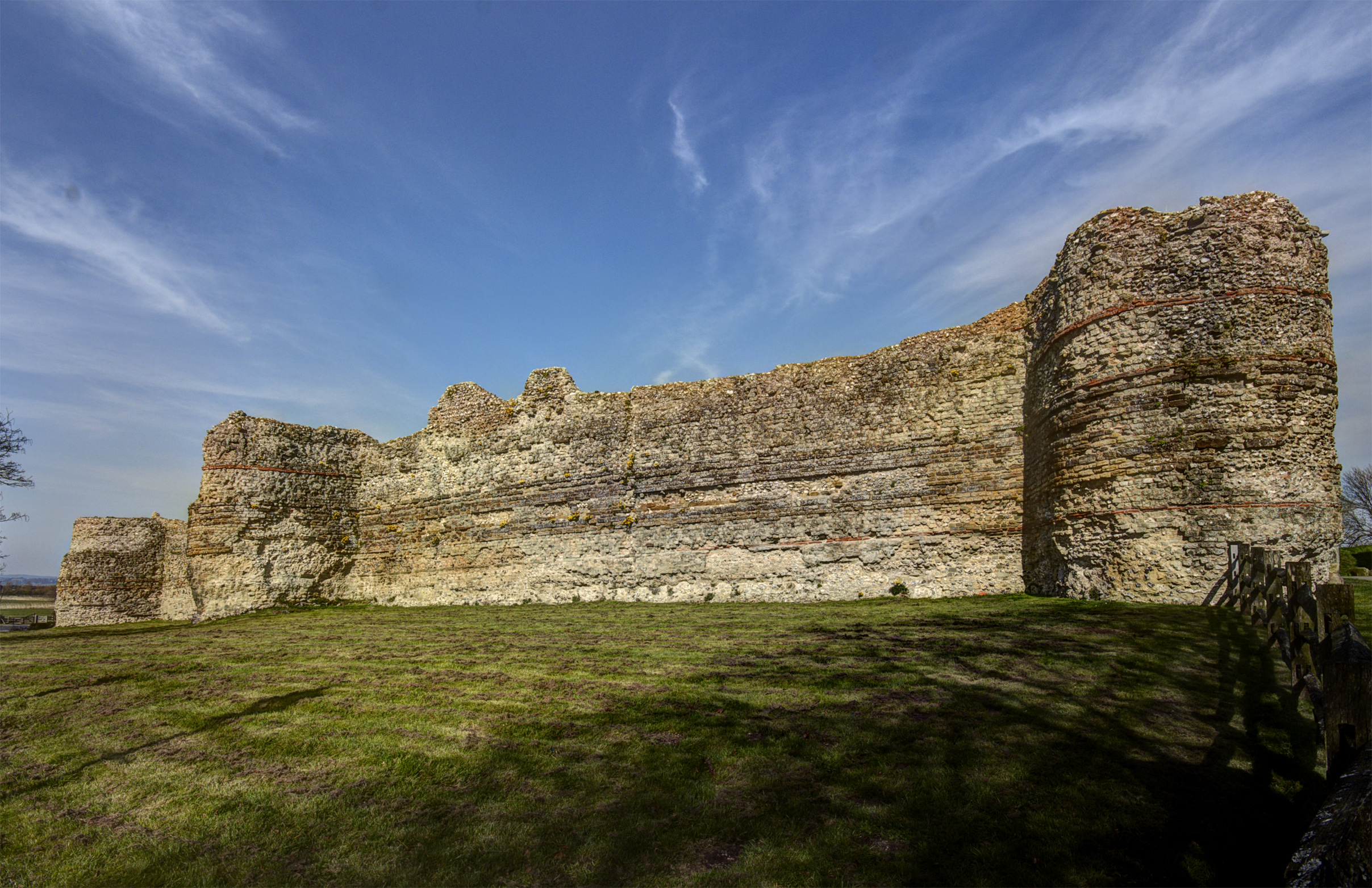
The Roman west curtain wall of Pevensey Castle, with its tell-tale bands of Roman bricks

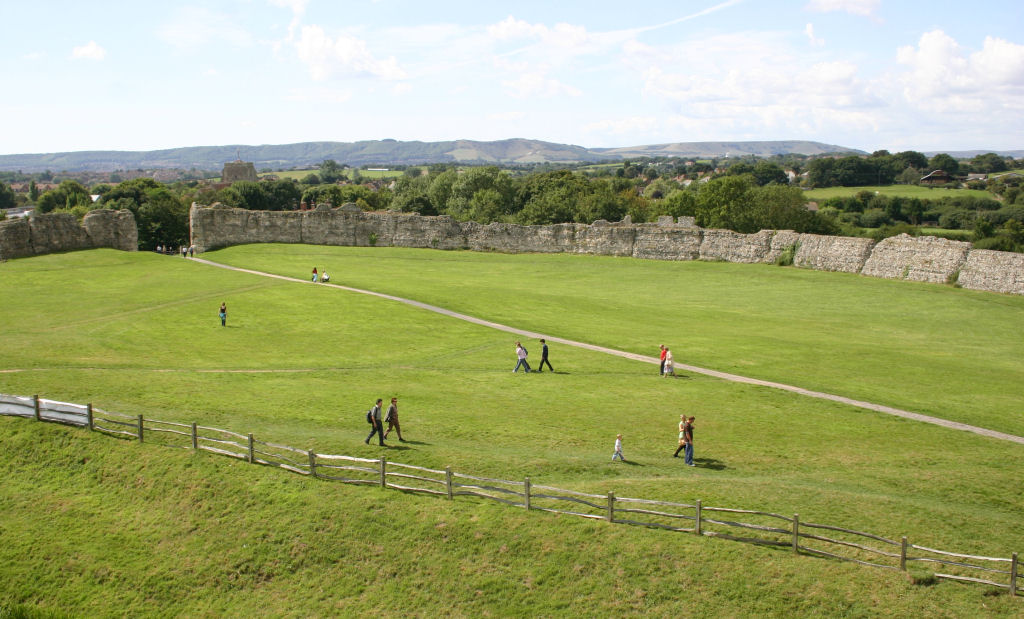
View from the inner bailey showing the west and north inner side of the Roman wall. The main west gate is at left.

The castle's curtain wall is built on a massive scale, with ramparts and projecting towers still standing up to 8.2 metres (27 ft) high (and probably about 9.5 metres (31 ft) high when built) and 4.2 metres (14 ft) thick at the base. The north, east and west sections of the curtain wall have survived mostly intact, with the exception of one fallen segment of the north wall; the south wall, which would have adjoined sea or marsh, has almost entirely disappeared. It is faced with ironstone and sandstone, though most of the original facing stones have been robbed out over the centuries; the structure visible now consists mostly of the rubble and sandstone core, bound together with mortar. Bonding courses of tiles run horizontally through the wall. An impression of its original appearance can be gleaned from an area in the north wall which has been excavated down to the still-intact foundations, revealing how it was once faced on both sides with small blocks of stone. The wall originally had a stepped appearance with at least two levels of steps on the interior face, though there is no surviving indication of how the garrison reached the top. At the top of the wall the remains of medieval crenellations can still be seen, which probably replaced Roman originals.

The D-shaped towers along the curtain wall are similar to those of several other Saxon Shore forts, although their placement is somewhat unusual. Because the fort was partly surrounded by marshes and water, which provided natural defences, the Romans economised by only building towers on the more vulnerable north-eastern and far western sectors. The towers were probably used to mount artillery weapons such as catapults and heavy crossbows. Ten towers still survive, though there may originally have been more before the loss of the south wall.

=== Gates ===
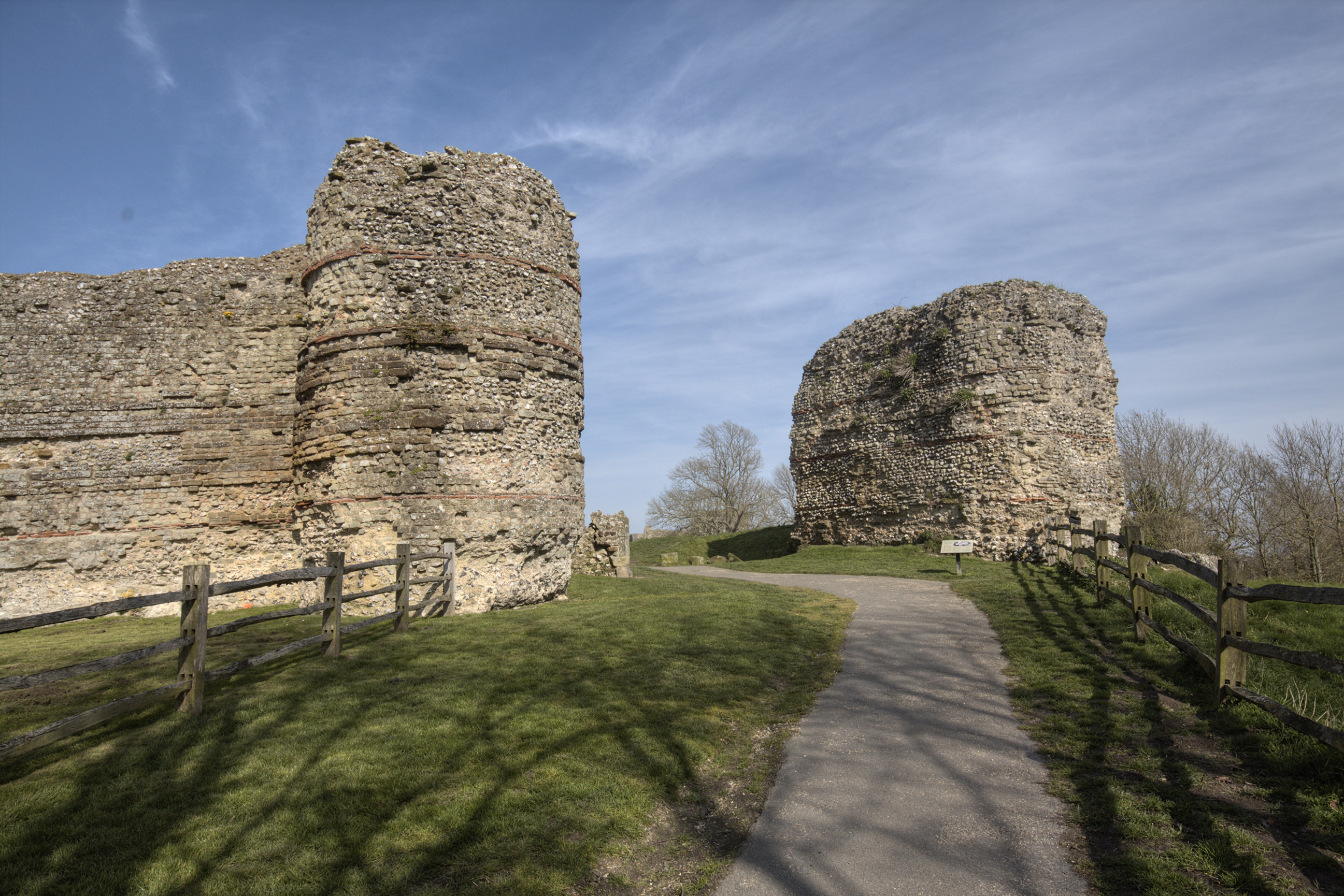
Roman west gate of Pevensey Castle; the main land entrance

The Roman fort had two principal entrances, one on the east side and the other on the west, guarded by clusters of towers. The west gate covered the landward access via the causeway that linked Pevensey to the mainland. A ditch bisected the causeway, which led up to a rectangular gatehouse with a single arch around 2.4 metres (7 ft 10 in) wide, with a D-shaped tower on each end from which archers could fire along the archway. The main entrance of the Saxon Shore fort at Portchester, built around the same period, had a very similar plan. Nothing now remains of the Roman gatehouse, which was replaced in the medieval period, while only a few stones are left of the medieval gatehouse.

The east gate, 2.8 metres (9 ft 2 in) wide, still stands; although what is visible now is principally medieval and 19th-century, the Roman original probably did not look much different. A postern gate was set into the north wall next to a section that has now collapsed. It was originally constructed in the form of a narrow curved passageway. Another postern gate may have been set into the collapsed south wall. These suggest that there may have been routes into the fort from across the marshes or access from a harbour, of which no trace remains.

=== Interior ===
The interior of the fort was artificially raised by the Romans, using earth dug from the foundation ditch, to bring it up to the level of the projecting step on the back of the wall. No evidence of significant buildings within the fort has been found by excavators. A number of Roman hearths are situated at regular intervals in the centre of the fort's interior, suggesting that they may have been the site of wooden barrack blocks. The buildings are conjectured to have been largely timber-framed wattle and daub structures which have left little trace.

==== Inner bailey ====
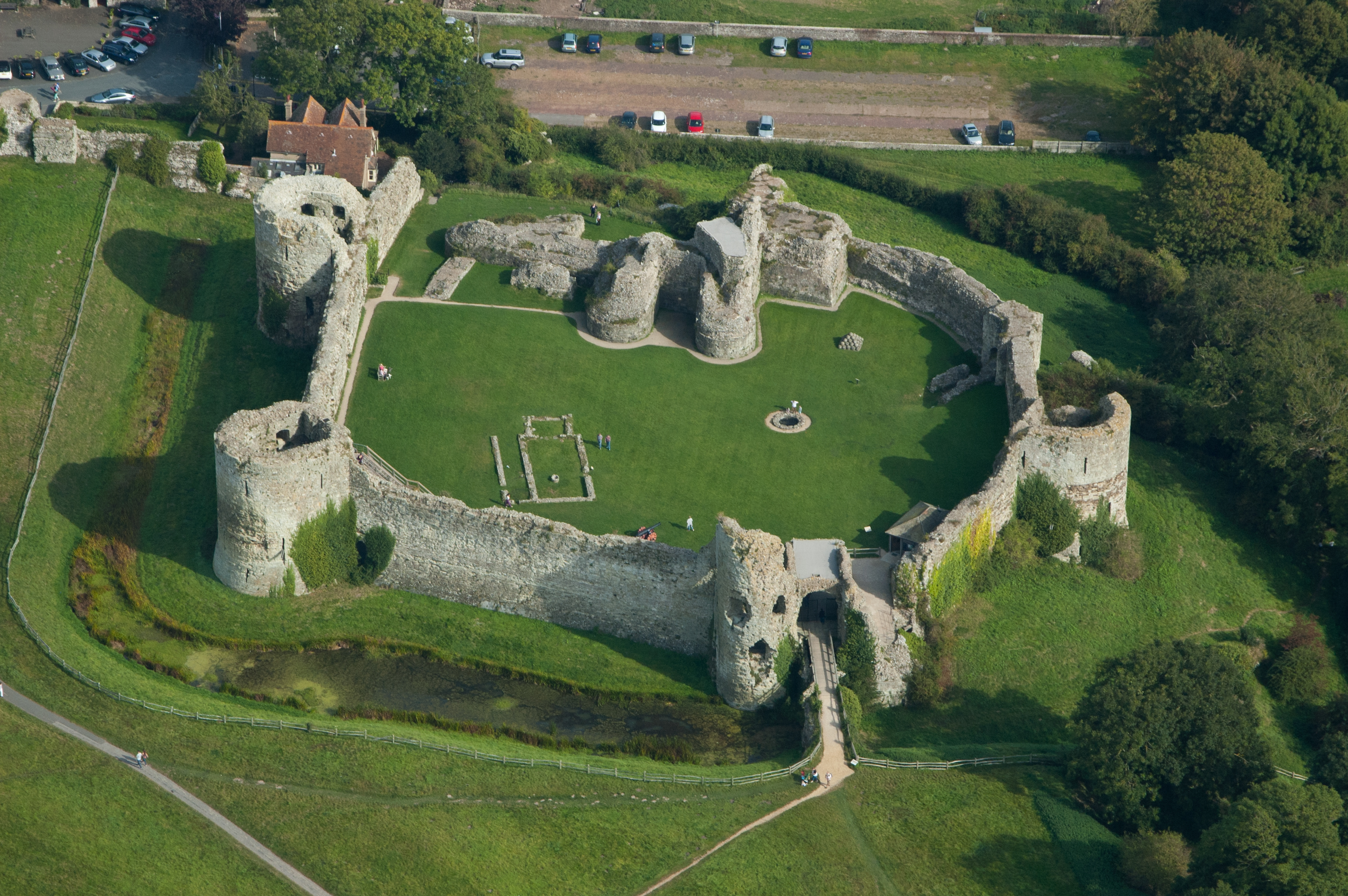
Aerial view of Pevensey Castle's inner bailey, showing remnants of a chapel and a well.

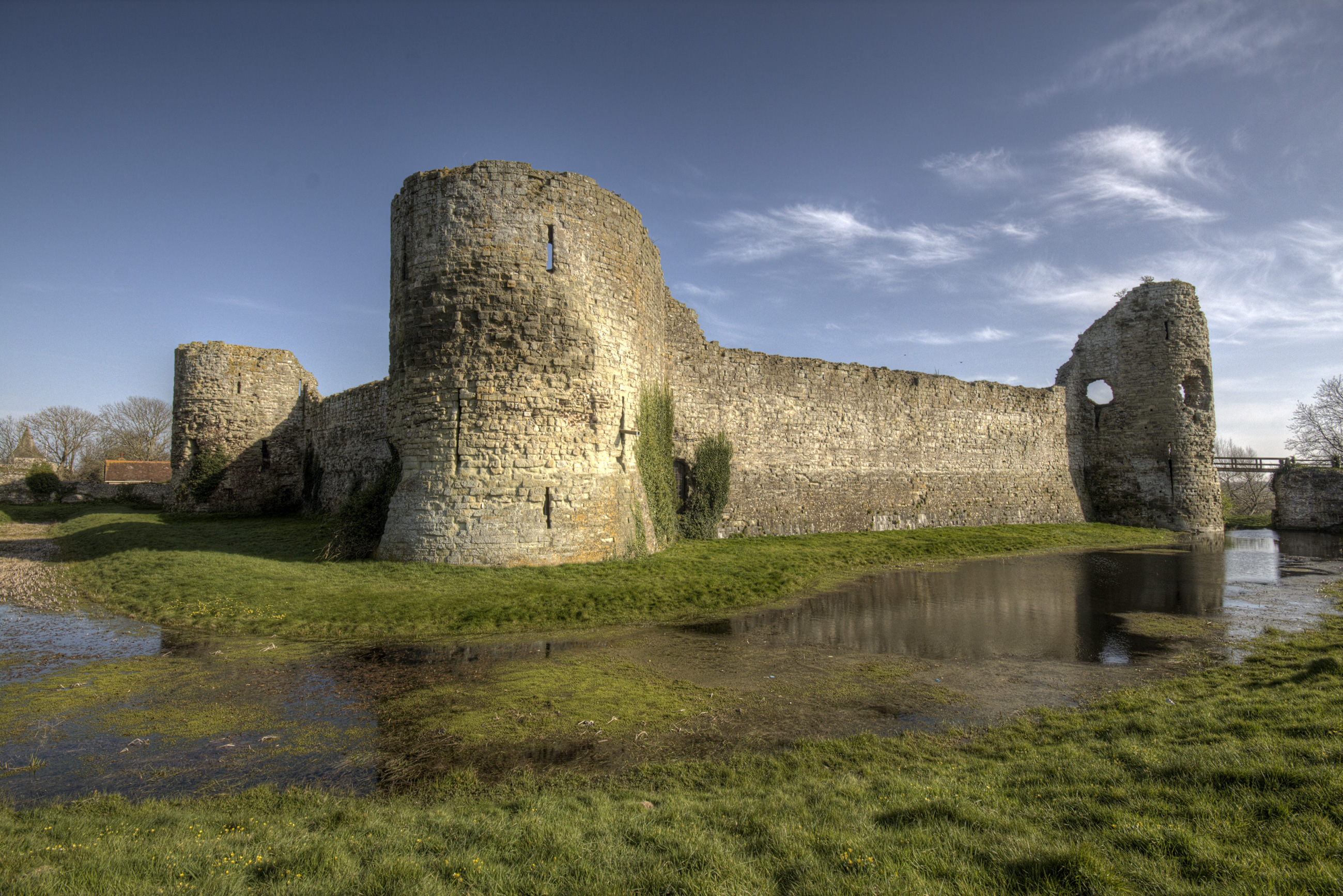
The medieval curtain wall and moat of the inner bailey

The Normans divided the interior of the old Roman fort into two fortified enclosures, referred to as the inner and outer baileys. The inner bailey of the castle was, in effect, a castle within a castle, consisting of a walled fortification with a tower at each corner, surrounded by a moat and with a keep of unusual design at its eastern extremity, adjoining the old Roman curtain wall. The present stone fortifications of the inner bailey date mainly from the 13th and 14th centuries. They replaced the original wood and earth fortifications of the Norman inner bailey, which occupied a much larger area of the Roman fort's interior. Traces of the Norman bailey's ditch and earthen rampart, which stretched right across the interior of the fort, can still be seen today. The inner bailey protected the castle's most important domestic buildings, while the outer bailey was used for buildings of lesser importance such as a granary for the manor of Pevensey.

The inner bailey's moat—which is fed by a spring—was probably over 18 metres (59 ft) wide when first dug. The moat protected a mid-13th-century curtain wall, which is still largely intact, that divides the inner and outer baileys. A wooden bridge around 20.7 metres (68 ft) long linked the inner and outer baileys, though the cost of maintaining it prompted its replacement in 1405 with a stone causeway and drawbridge pit that can still be seen today. The principal entrance to the inner bailey was through the early-13th-century gatehouse at the end of the entrance bridge, which had two D-shaped towers flanking a vaulted entrance passage. The towers were built on three levels with arrow slits in each level and basements below, which have survived intact. One of the basements can be reached via a spiral staircase; the other can only be accessed through a hole in the tower's floor and may have been used as a prison cell or oubliette. The gatehouse towers were built with open backs, which were probably closed by a wooden wall.

Three other towers still stand on the east, north and south sides of the inner bailey's curtain wall. Built in the mid-13th century, they each had three floors which were accessed through separate entrances on each level. Lighting was provided by arrow-slits, and the upper room in each tower, which was the only one to have a fireplace, was probably used as a lodging area. A latrine was also provided. Only the north tower is known to have been completed; however, its vaulted basement was mostly destroyed around 1317 when the roof and floors of the tower collapsed into it. It is not clear whether the south and east towers were ever completed. An estimate written in 1317 reveals that the towers were thatched, lacking castellations and a proper lead roof, but it is not known whether the work itemised in the estimate was ever carried out. The interiors of the towers were substantially modified in 1940.

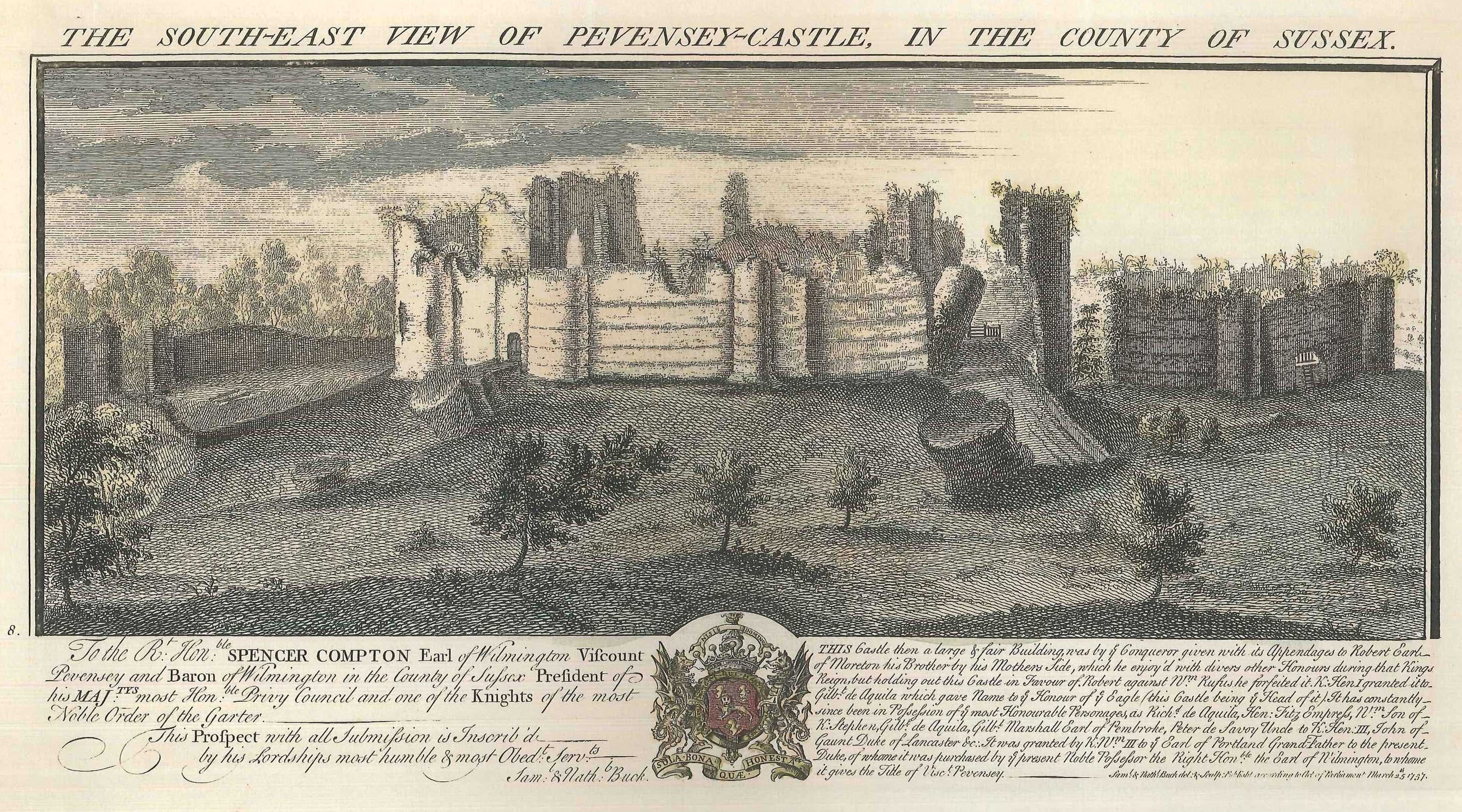
Samuel and Nathaniel Buck's depiction of the ruined castle in 1737

The interior of the inner bailey is now a broad, grassy area dominated by the stump of the keep at its eastern edge, which survives only up to its first floor. Despite the massive nature of the ruins, they preserve little of the original design apart from its unique ground plan. It consisted of a rectangular block measuring about 16.8 metres (55 ft) by 9 metres (30 ft) internally with seven projecting towers, a design found in no other medieval castle. Nothing remains of the interior and the uniqueness of its design makes it difficult to reconstruct its internal layout. Surviving 14th-century documents record that it contained a kitchen and a chapel, and had an iron door at its main entrance which was approached up a wooden stair. Like most Norman keeps, the entrance was situated on the first floor; the ground floor lacks any openings and it appears to have been constructed as a solid mass of masonry filled with clay. The near-total destruction of everything above the first floor means that the keep's original height is unknown, but it may have stood to a height of about 25 metres (82 ft) or so. (Note: By comparison, Rochester Castle's 12th-century keep—which is the tallest-surviving great tower in England—is 34 metres (112 ft) tall.) The unusual design of the keep may have been influenced by Roman architecture.

The keep underwent at least two redesigns in the first half of the 14th century, possibly prompted by damage inflicted in earlier sieges. One of the redesigns involved constructing an adjoining square tower which some have suggested could have been used to mount a catapult; large stone balls, used as catapult ammunition, can still be seen in the inner bailey today. The building was recorded to be dilapidated for much of the 14th century despite repeated repairs, and had fallen into ruin by the 16th century. It was subjected to systematic stone-robbing for centuries; as early as 1591, it was recorded that all the best stones had been "imbeselled and carried away" and that one family had removed no fewer than 677 cartloads of ashlar facing-stone from the keep's walls. A late-18th-century engraving shows the remains of the building in a state of collapse and it had completely collapsed by the 1880s. The ruins were largely buried under a great heap of earth and clay that had been deposited sometime in the late medieval or early modern periods, which was not removed until the 1920s. The reason for the construction of this mound over the ruined keep is unclear, but it may have been related to the brief Elizabethan use of the castle as a gun position.

A number of other buildings once stood in the inner bailey, though only traces now remain. The interior of the curtain wall was lined with timber-framed domestic buildings such as the great hall, which appears to have been totally rebuilt by Edward I in 1301–02 and possibly on other occasions. The arrangement of these buildings is not known but remains of the fireplaces can still be seen built into the curtain wall. Due to the relatively small space available in the inner bailey, the buildings would have been very narrow. The stone foundations of a small chapel are also visible in the inner bailey. The chapel was first documented in the 13th century and was rebuilt in 1302, either on the existing stone foundations or in the outer bailey in a new location. The castle's water supply was provided by a well situated beside the chapel. It has never been fully dug out, but investigations have revealed that it is lined with stone to a depth of around 50 feet (15 m) and with wood beyond that.

== History ==
=== Roman fort ===
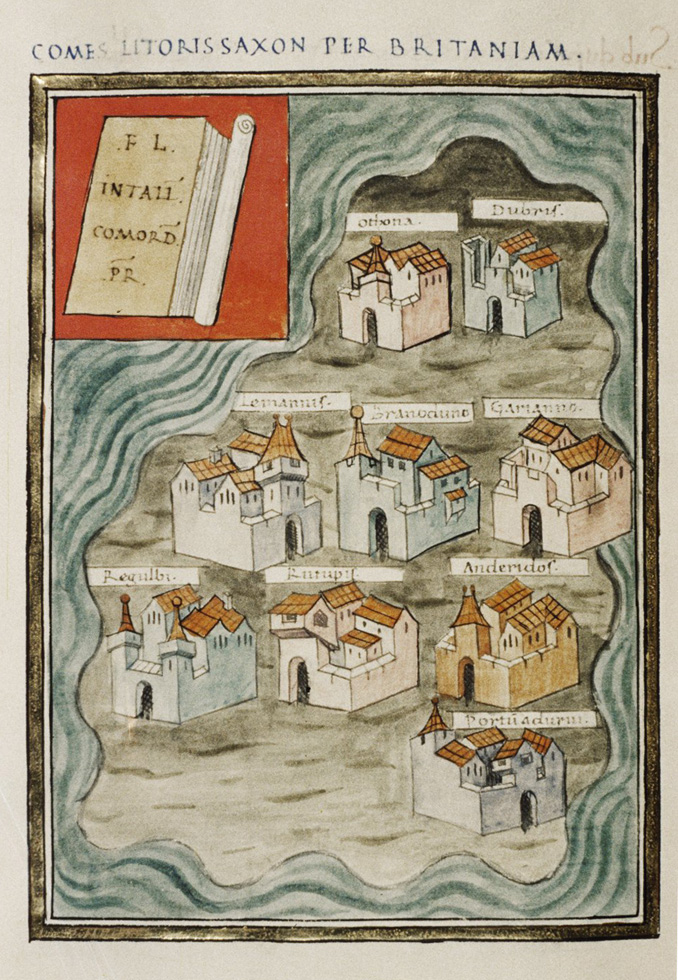
The nine British Saxon Shore forts in the Roman Notitia Dignitatum. Pevensey Castle or Anderitum is the third fort on the third row down. Bodleian Library, Oxford

Pevensey Castle was established as one of the nine Late Roman forts on the British side of the Saxon Shore (Latin: Litus Saxonicum). The fort is named as Anderitum, apparently meaning "great ford", in the Notitia Dignitatum, a list of Roman "dignities" (i.e. public offices) as of the 5th century. (An alternative spelling of Anderida or Anderita has also been proposed, but is disfavoured.)

The fort was long thought to have been built in the mid-4th century but it has been dated to around 290, based on the dating of wooden piles which were found underpinning the Roman walls in an excavation carried out in 1994. Other Saxon Shore forts were built or reconstructed around this time as part of a systematic programme of improvements to the coastal defences of Roman Britain. The construction of the Saxon Shore forts has been linked to the raids that Saxon and Jute pirates (from what is now northern Germany and mainland Denmark) were mounting against communities along the North Sea and English Channel. An alternative explanation is that Anderitum was built to defend Roman Britain from Rome itself. Carausius, a Roman general who commanded the Classis Britannica (the Roman fleet based in the English Channel), revolted against Rome in 286 and declared himself emperor of Britain and northern Gaul. He was assassinated in 293 by his treasurer, Allectus, who was himself killed in 296 when the Roman emperor Constantius Chlorus invaded Britain to overthrow the usurper.

Coins of both Carausius and Allectus have been discovered buried in the foundations of the fort's walls. A later coin of 330–335 was found under a tower in the 1930s, suggesting that the fort may have undergone a major repair or reconstruction around that time. The usurpers had inherited an existing system of coastal defence—the earlier Saxon Shore forts—and may have decided to augment it with the construction of Pevensey Castle and its close contemporary, Portus Adurni (Portchester Castle).

Anderitum appears to have been a particularly important link in the Saxon Shore forts, which extended from Hampshire to Norfolk and may have been connected by intermediate watchtowers. The Notitia Dignitatum mentions a fleet that was presumably based there, the Classis Anderidaensis. It would probably have acted in coordination with naval units based on the other side of the Channel to intercept pirate ships passing through the Channel. Like the other Saxon Shore forts, Anderitum's position at a strategic harbour would have enabled the Romans to control access to the shoreline and prevent invaders from penetrating inland. It was linked by a road built in the late Roman period, probably at the same time as the fort.

==== Construction ====
It is not known how long it took for Pevensey castle to be constructed, but it has been estimated that it took around 160,000 man-days to complete, equivalent to 285 men spending two years building it or 115 men over five years. At least four gangs of builders appear to have worked on the surviving sections of walls; each gang was given a stretch of about 20 metres (66 ft) at a time to build but executed the work in significantly different styles, for instance using differing numbers of tiled bonding-courses or ironstone facing in particular places. This may simply indicate varying levels of availability of construction materials at the time each segment was built, leading the gangs to use whatever supplies were available at that moment. The amount of construction material required was very large, equating to about 31,600 m^{3} (1.12 million ft^{3}) of stone and mortar. It is not known how it was transported to the site, but that volume of material would have needed some 600 boat loads or 49,000 wagon loads, requiring 250 wagons pulled by 1,500–2,000 oxen to move it from the quarries to Pevensey. Given the scale of the requirements for land transportation, it seems more likely that the raw materials were instead moved by sea, though even this would have been a significant operation; it has been estimated that 18 vessels would have been needed for a continuous supply operation carried out over a season of 280 days.

The curtain wall was not all built at once but was constructed in segments, as can be seen from vertical breaks in the stonework which mark where sections met. The wall is built on top of complex foundations constructed from rubble and timber set into a ditch 15 feet (4.6 m) deep. Oak piles were driven into the trench and packed with flint and clay, above which a horizontal framework of oak beams was set with more flint and clay. The foundation was finally covered over with cement before the walls were built on top. Some of the timbers have survived, allowing archaeologists to date the fort through dendochronology. Other dating evidence was discredited in the 1970s. An excavation in 1906–08 found shattered tiles stamped HON AUG ANDRIA, which were used to attribute Pevensey Castle's construction to the reign of the early-5th-century emperor Honorius. However, the use of thermoluminescence dating revealed that the tiles had been made around the time of the excavation. It is suspected that Charles Dawson, who has been blamed for the Piltdown Man hoax, was the author of the forged tiles.

==== Garrison ====
Anderitum is recorded in the Notitia Dignitatum as the base of the praepositus numeri Abulcorum—an infantry unit or numerus of the limitanei or border forces. It also mentions army and naval units bearing the fort's name in connection with the Vicus Julius, in the Roman army in Gaul and stationed at Lutetia (modern Paris). This suggests that by the time the Notitia was written, the original garrison had been moved to Gaul and replaced with the numerus Abulcorum. The Abulci are mentioned in connection with the field army in Gaul and in the suppression of the rebellion of Magnentius in Pannonia Secunda in 351. It is not known whether their name is a geographical or functional one but their description by Zosimus suggests that they were an elite body of troops, who served both in the field army and, probably in the form of a single detachment, at Anderitum. They may have been foederati, troops raised from allied barbarian tribes and put under the command of a Roman prefect, or perhaps even a single band of warriors with their own leader. Similar numeri were recorded in the Notitia Dignitata as being stationed in other Saxon Shore forts.

=== Abandonment and post-Roman use ===
Unlike at many other Roman forts, no civilian settlement or vicus appears to have been established outside the walls of Pevensey Castle; this was probably because the fort was at the end of a peninsula with limited room for additional construction. When the Roman army retreated from Britain in 410, civilians appear to have moved into the abandoned fort, perhaps for protection against Saxon raiders, and its name continued to be used well into the Saxon period. According to the Anglo-Saxon Chronicle, in 477 a Saxon raid drove local people into the forest of Andreadsleag (which from another reference seems to have stretched over 200 kilometres (120 mi) from the mouth of the River Lympne to Hampshire). Although the history of the fort at this time is unrecorded, archaeological evidence indicates that its inhabitants had wide-ranging trade links that enabled them to import wares from as far afield as Macedonia and Syria. They may have exported timber and iron from the Sussex Weald to pay for such costly goods.

In 491, the Chronicle records that the Saxons Aelle and Cissa "besieged Andredadsceaster and slew all the inhabitants; there was not even one Briton left there." It is uncertain whether habitation of the fort continued after this event, which is now thought to have happened around 471 rather than the date recorded by the Chronicle (due to a dating error by Gildas, on whose work the Chronicle draws). The fort appears to have been resettled by about the mid-6th century by a Saxon community which left evidence of its occupation in the shape of pottery, glass and other items. By the late Anglo-Saxon period, Pevensey had become a well-established fishing port and producer of salt. Whereas the modern village of Pevensey is situated entirely outside the walls, the 11th-century village appears to have been situated within the Roman walls. At the time of the Norman Conquest in 1066 it had a population of 52 burgesses with a harbour and saltworks outside the walls. A civilian settlement within the castle walls evidently persisted for some considerable time after the Conquest, as a licence of 1250 refers to the Roman fortress as the "outer wall of the town".

=== Norman period and after ===
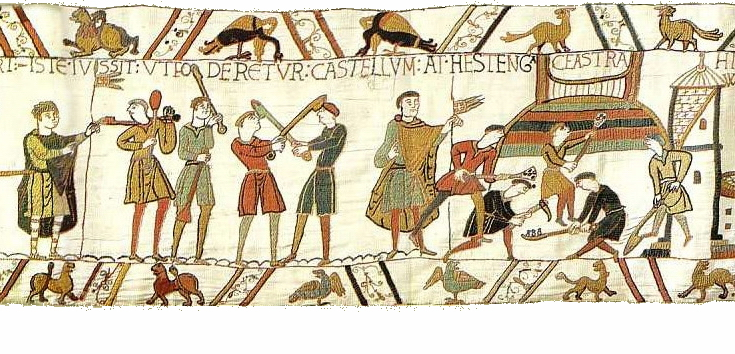
William the Conqueror's army building a castle at Hestengaceastra in the Bayeux Tapestry—possibly Pevensey Castle, but much more likely Hastings Castle on the name evidence

Anderitum had fallen into ruin by the time of the Norman Conquest of England but it still remained a formidable fortification in a very strategic location, offering a natural anchorage near one of the narrowest points of the English Channel. By this time the locality was known as Pevensey, meaning "River of [a man named] Pefen" (deriving from the Anglo-Saxon personal name Pefen plus eã, "river", presumably a reference to the now largely silted-up Pevensey Haven).

When William the Conqueror launched his invasion of England by landing at Pevensey Bay on 28 September 1066, his army sheltered for the night in a temporary fortification situated within the old Roman fort. The Normans dug a ditch across the causeway linking the fort with the mainland and made repairs to the Roman walls to strengthen them. The army left for Hastings the following day, en route to the Battle of Hastings. The Bayeux Tapestry depicts William's army constructing a castle at "Hestengaceastra", a Latinised rendition of the Saxon placename Haestingaceaster. As placenames with the suffix—ceastre were almost always associated with Roman forts (compare Manchester, Lancaster, Doncaster etc.) and no Roman fort is known to have existed at the modern site of Hastings, it has been suggested that the name actually refers to Anderitum—in which case the depiction in the Tapestry may show the construction of the temporary Norman castle within the Roman fortress walls.

William's choice of Pevensey as a defensive location may not have been entirely due to practical military reasons. It also had political connotations, implying that the Normans were on a level with the Romans. He followed a similar pattern elsewhere in England, building the Tower of London alongside the still-extant Roman city wall and constructing Colchester Castle on top of the ruins of the Temple of Claudius.

Following William's victory at Hastings, the county of Sussex came to be seen by the new regime as being of essential military value. It was both a frontier zone and an essential link between England and Normandy. The existing tenurial arrangements in the county were swept away and replaced by five subdivisions, or rapes, each of which was given to one of William's most important followers. Each rape was associated with a major castle, Pevensey being one of them. In 1067 William left England for Normandy via Pevensey. He also appears to have used the site to distribute lands to his Norman followers, with Pevensey Castle and the surrounding Rape of Pevensey being gifted to his half-brother Robert, Count of Mortain.

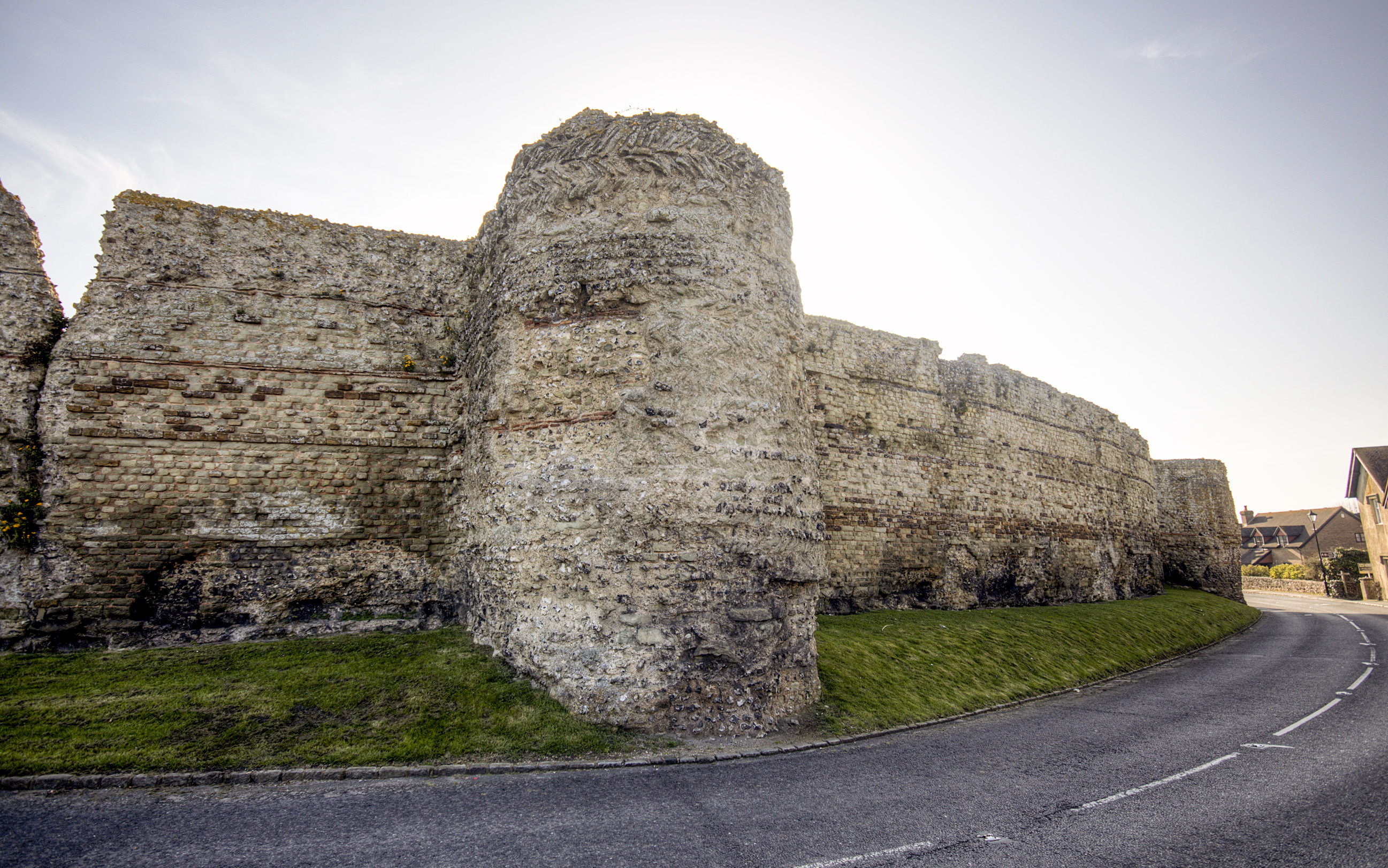
Section of the Roman east wall of Pevensey Castle showing Norman repairs (the herringbone-style stonework at the top of the tower)

William's temporary fortification within the Roman walls was expanded to create a permanent Norman castle at Pevensey, probably during Robert's tenure sometime in the 1070s. The Roman walls were further repaired and two enclosures or baileys were created, divided by a ditch and a palisade constructed from timber. Robert also founded a small borough outside the Roman walls which was recorded as having 110 burgesses and a mint by the time the Domesday Book was compiled in 1086. This may have been the original site of the modern village of Pevensey, but it is equally possible that Robert's borough may have been the foundation site of the village of Westham to the west of the castle, whose layout has many similarities to that of other Norman new towns.

The Norman castle's defences were put to the test for the first time in the Rebellion of 1088, when Norman barons allied with Robert Curthose, Duke of Normandy rebelled against the new king William Rufus. The barons, who were also supported by William the Conqueror's half-brothers Robert of Mortain and Bishop Odo of Bayeux, defended Pevensey Castle against an army led personally by William Rufus. Although the castle's defences were strong enough to resist assaults from land and sea, its defenders were forced to surrender when they ran out of food after six weeks. Robert was allowed to keep the castle but his son William, Count of Mortain was stripped of it, along with his other English estates, after rebelling against Henry I in the early 12th century.

Henry re-granted Pevensey Castle to Gilbert I de l'Aigle but continued to use it for his own purposes, as happened in 1101 when he spent the summer at Pevensey to deter a threatened invasion by Duke Robert of Normandy. Pevensey was confiscated again by the Crown under King Stephen, with Gilbert's family also losing the rest of their possessions. It was subsequently re-granted to Gilbert de Clare, 1st Earl of Pembroke, who switched his allegiance to Stephen's cousin and rival, the Empress Matilda, in 1141. Although Gilbert changed his loyalty back to Stephen the following year, he was taken hostage by the king in 1147 after a revolt by Gilbert's uncle, Ranulf de Gernon, 4th Earl of Chester. A promise to surrender the Clare family's castles secured Gilbert's release but as soon as he was freed, he too rebelled. In response, Stephen undertook the second siege of Pevensey Castle with a land and sea blockade. The castle once again proved impervious to direct assault but the garrison was eventually starved out.

=== Later medieval use ===
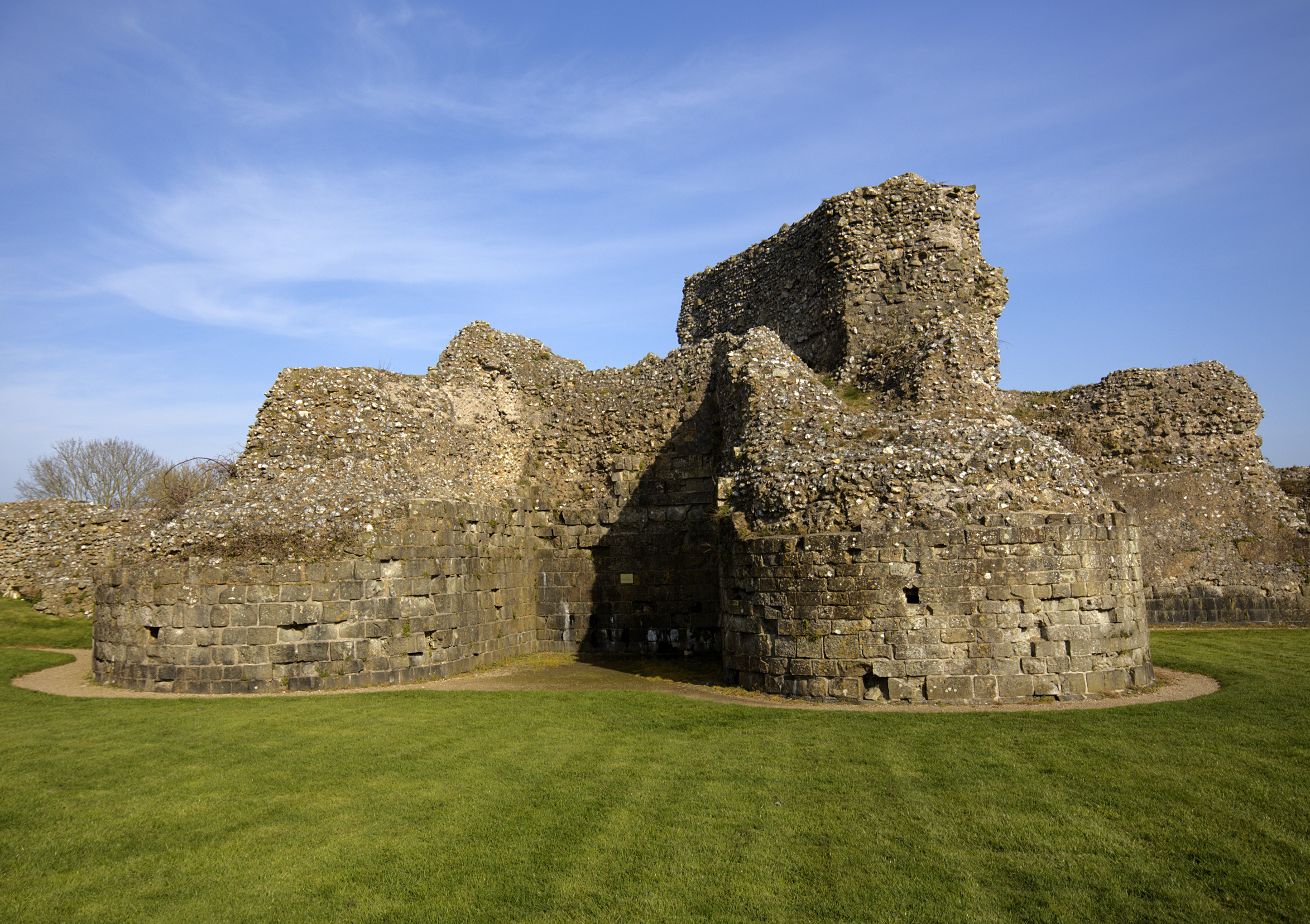
The stump of the 13th-century keep of Pevensey Castle

Gilbert's disloyalty led to the Crown seizing the castle again and taking on the burden of repairing and maintaining it. The expenditure was recorded in still-surviving Treasury accounts which provide a valuable insight into the development of the castle during the later medieval period. In the 1180s the defences appear to have been a combination of stone walls (the old Roman structure) with Norman modifications, plus earthworks and timber palisades. They were maintained in part by some of the local manors, which were under a feudal obligation called heckage that required them to repair and keep up sections of the palisades.

Pevensey Castle appears to have acquired its first major new stone buildings in the 1190s. Their construction may be indicated by a series of substantial payments for works at the castle during the reign of Richard I. The keep and gatehouse may have been constructed under Richard, though mentions from 1130 of "the Tower of Pevensey" suggest that there may have been an earlier stone building on the site, or that the keep was constructed at this earlier date. Whenever it was built, it was probably destroyed by about 1216 when Richard's successor John fought off an invasion led by Prince Louis of France. The French invasion during the First Barons' War forced John to order the slighting of Pevensey Castle, as he did not have enough men to garrison it and could not afford it to fall into French hands.

A subsequent rebuilding saw the timber palisades of the inner bailey replaced by stone walls and towers. Exactly when this happened is unclear, but it may have been under Peter of Savoy, the Earl of Richmond, who was granted the castle by Henry III in 1246. There is no record of the rebuilding but in 1254 Peter ended the feudal requirement to maintain the palisades and replaced it with cash payments. This probably reflected the replacement of the palisades with the stone walls and towers visible today. The castle faced a lengthy siege only a decade later during the Second Barons' War from the rebel baron Simon de Montfort, following Henry's defeat in the Battle of Lewes. Defeated members of the royalist army fled to Pevensey, pursued by de Montford's forces, but the garrison refused an invitation to surrender and endured over a year of besiegement. Their adversaries were unable to stop supplies reaching the castle despite digging a ditch to cut it off from the mainland; its garrison raided the surrounding countryside and sought to obtain fresh supplies of men and weapons by sea in December 1264. The costly and ineffective siege was eventually lifted in July 1265. We know the name of at least one of the defenders of the castle from Savoyard archives held in Turin, that of Nantelme de Cholay, a vassal of Peter of Savoy as Seigneur de Faucigny from what is now Choulex near Geneva. We know that Cholay had allies with him since the source quotes also his "sociorum" which we can translate as allies or associates. The siege caused significant damage to the castle, with the Roman wall toppled on the south side. The parish churches at Pevensey and Westham also suffered damage, which the attackers may have caused in using them as siege castles (temporary fortresses and artillery platforms).

Peter continued to control Pevensey Castle after de Montford's defeat and death at the Battle of Evesham in August 1265. It became Crown property after Peter's death, when Henry III's queen Eleanor of Provence acquired the castle. It remained with the Crown for another century under the control of several queens consort, including Edward II's wife Isabella and Edward III's wife Philippa, who were responsible for appointing the castle's Constables. By this time, the silting of Pevensey Bay was evidently having an effect on the garrison's ability to resupply via the sea. Accounts from 1288 indicate that seaborne access was becoming increasingly difficult, causing problems in unloading goods. However, it continued to play a significant role in the defence of the south coast against French raids and was occupied through much of the 14th century by a garrison consisting of between twenty and thirty men. These usually comprised ten men-at-arms, twenty archers and a watchman, who were supplied with provisions and armour. The Duke of Lancaster, John of Gaunt, refused to garrison it in 1377 five years after he took possession of the castle, asserting that he was wealthy enough to rebuild it if a French attack destroyed it. His actions attracted public hostility which culminated during the Peasants' Revolt of 1381 when a mob attacked the castle, burnt its court rolls and abused the steward.

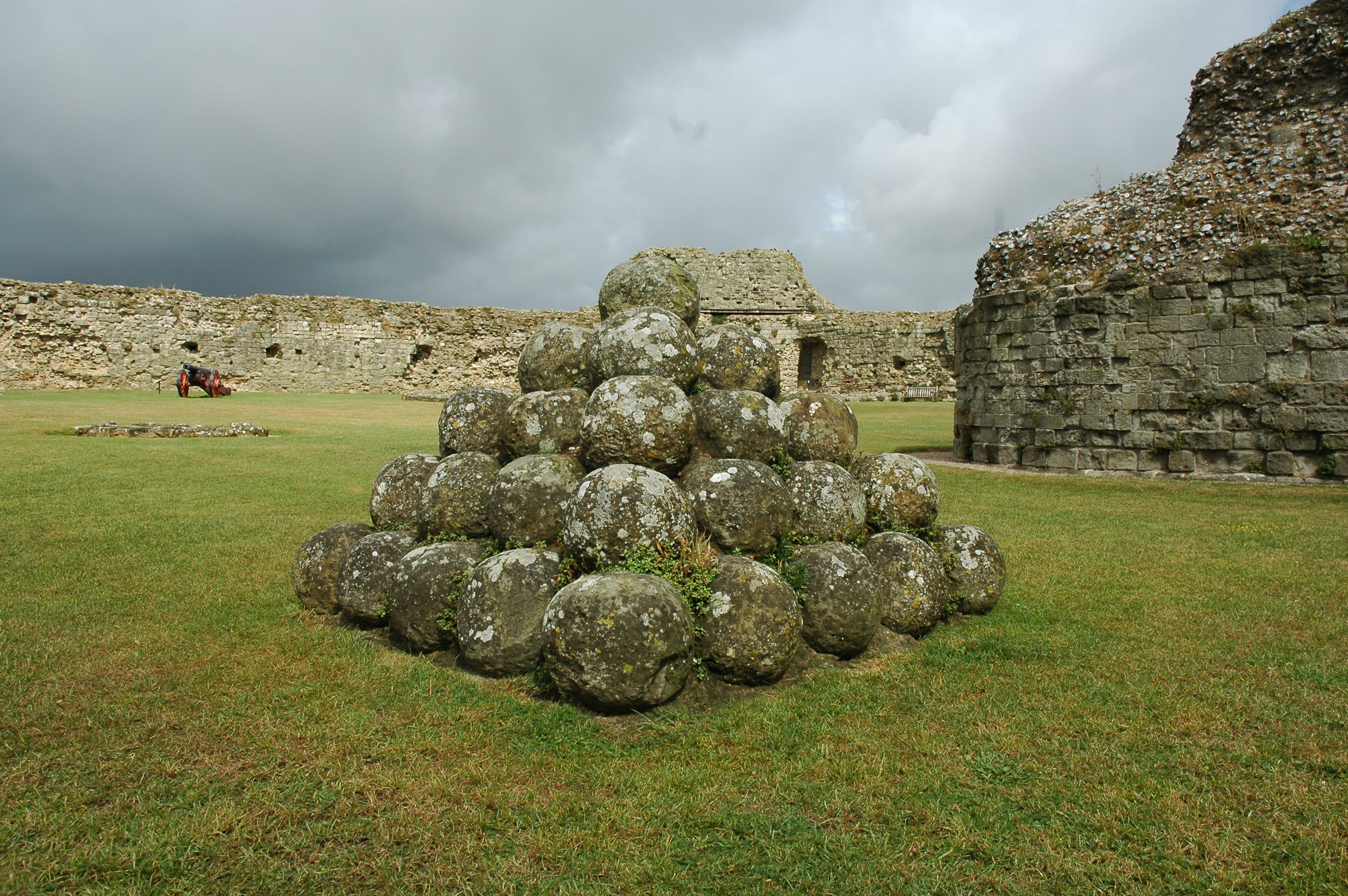
Catapult or trebuchet ammunition at Pevensey Castle

The castle underwent repeated repair work during the 14th century, though poor maintenance and corruption appears to have caused its fabric to deteriorate rapidly. The main buildings of the inner bailey were totally reconstructed in 1301 but were reported to be in a ruinous condition only five years later. The castle's constable, Roger de Levelande, was accused of illicitly asset-stripping the castle by breaking up and selling the wooden bridge that connected it to the mainland. Some "wardens" were also accused of burning the timbers of a disused barn. It was estimated that the resulting damage and the ongoing structural deterioration to the curtain wall would cost over £1,000 to repair. Around 1325, the keep was partly demolished and rebuilt. It is possible that by this time the Roman curtain wall was in such a poor state that it was no longer considered part of the castle defences. Various late-13th- and early-14th-century records describe how sections of the wall had fallen down or been destroyed in sieges. The collapse of the wall on the north-west side is thought to have occurred by no later than the middle of the 13th century, and this event may have made the outer bailey indefensible thereafter.

Pevensey Castle was besieged again for the fourth and last time in its history in 1399. By this time it was controlled by Sir John Pelham, one of Gaunt's retainers, who had been appointed to the Constableship in 1394. Pelham supported Gaunt's son, Henry Bolingbroke—the later Henry IV—in his rebellion against Richard II. The king's forces besieged the castle, trapping Pelham and the garrison inside. In a letter sent to Bolingbroke, Pelham wrote:

My dear Lord ... if it please you to know of my affairs, I am here bylaid in manner of a siege, with the counties of Sussex, Surrey and a great part of Kent, so that I may not out, nor no vitals get me without much difficulty. Wherefore my dear may it please you, by the advice of your wise council, to give remedy to the salvation of your castle, and withstand the malice of the shire ... Farewell my dear Lord, the Holy Trinity keep you from your enemies, and soon send me good tidings of you. Written at Pevensey in the Castle, on Saint Jacob day last past. By ever your own poor, J. Pelham

The siege failed, Bolingbroke was crowned and the new king granted the Castle and Honour of Pevensey to Pelham as a reward for his loyalty. The Lancastrian kings subsequently used the castle as a prison for high-ranking nobles. Its inmates included King James I of Scotland, who was captured while en route to France in 1405, and Edward of Norwich, 2nd Duke of York, who was held at Pevensey after becoming involved in a plot against Henry IV. On his death, Edward bestowed £20 in his will to Thomas Playsted, apparently one of his jailers, "for the kindness he showed me when I was in ward at Pevensey." Henry IV's second wife Joan of Navarre was imprisoned by Joan's stepson Henry V on charges of plotting to kill him through witchcraft; she was held at Pevensey between December 1419 and March 1420 before being moved to Leeds Castle in Kent and eventually released in 1422. When the Tudor dynasty took over the castle was abandoned, and by 1573 it was recorded to be in ruins.

=== Usage in the modern period ===
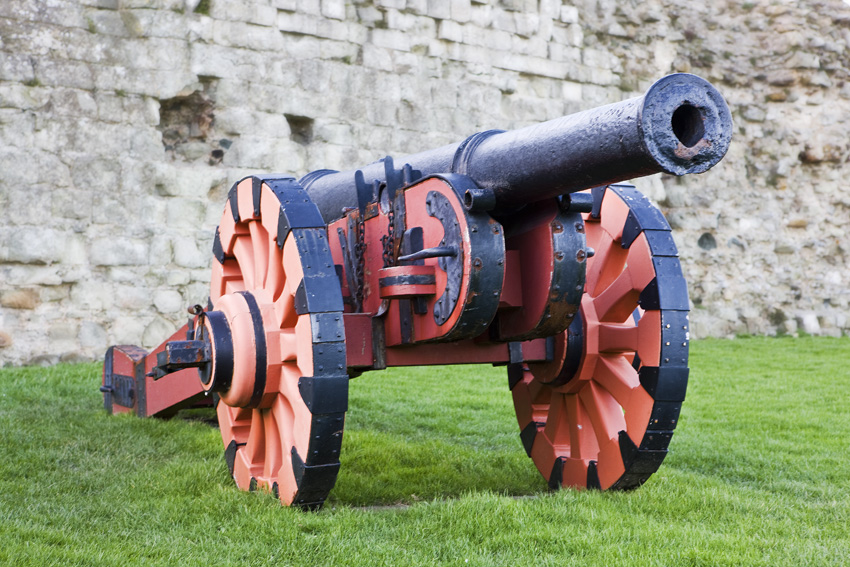
Elizabethan cannon at Pevensey Castle, mounted on a replica carriage

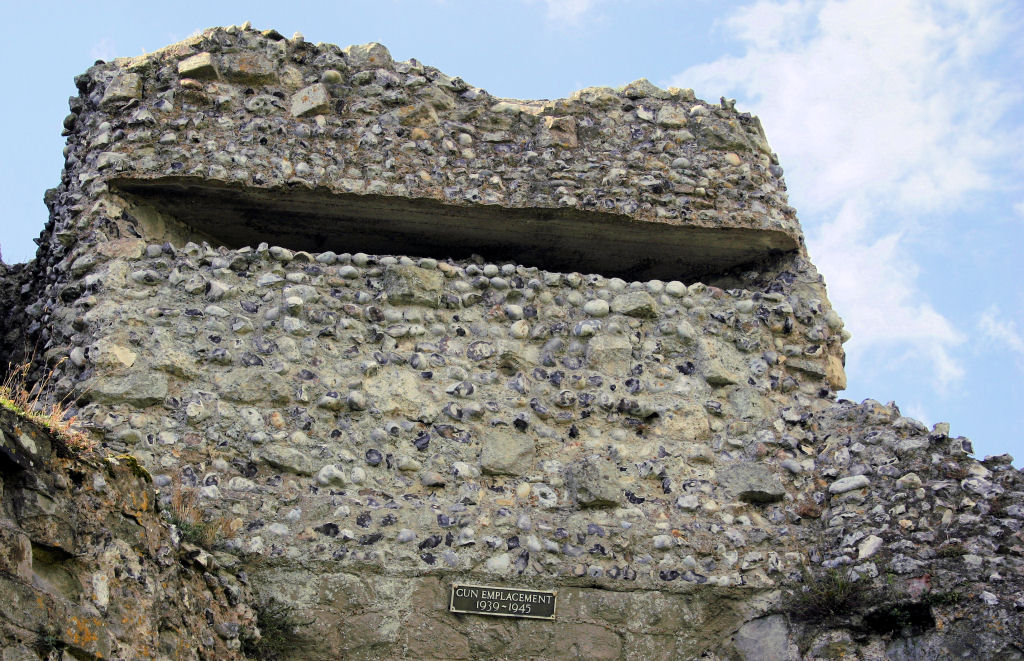
Second World War machine-gun post incorporated into Pevensey's keep, facing east, and artfully disguised

Elizabeth I ordered the castle's remains to be "utterlye raysed", but her order was not enforced and it remained standing. In 1587, the castle was reoccupied—though not rebuilt—to serve as a gun position against the threat of a Spanish invasion. A U-shaped earth emplacement was built in the outer bailey, facing south over the collapsed section of the Roman wall. Two iron demi-culverin cannons were installed and were in place at the time of the Spanish Armada in 1588, although the Armada failed and they were never used in anger. One of the guns, marked with a Tudor rose and the initials E.R. (Elizabeth Regina), has been preserved and can be seen in the inner bailey of the castle mounted on a replica carriage. Although the cannon was recorded at the time as being only "of small value" it is now one of only a few cast-iron cannons to have survived from the Elizabethan period. It was almost certainly manufactured locally in the Sussex Weald.

Pevensey Castle remained abandoned and crumbling from the end of the 16th century to the first quarter of the 20th. It was nearly demolished during the period of the English Commonwealth in the 17th century when Oliver Cromwell's Parliamentary Commissioners sold it for £40 to a builder, John Warr of Westminster, who planned to quarry it for its stones. Very little work took place, however, and the Crown reacquired the castle in 1660. It was restored to the possession of the Pelham family, until in 1730 the Duke of Newcastle resigned it to Spencer Compton, 1st Earl of Wilmington. It was subsequently acquired by the House of Cavendish. In 1925 its last private owner, the 9th Duke of Devonshire, gave the castle to the state as a historic monument and it underwent repairs and some reconstruction under the supervision of the Ministry of Works.

It acquired a fresh military significance in 1940 when Pevensey's exposed shoreline and flat hinterland became a possible target area for a German invasion after the fall of France. It was reoccupied by the military for the first time in over 400 years, with British and Canadian troops garrisoning it from May 1940, and Americans later. The towers of the inner bailey were converted into troop accommodation by lining the walls with bricks and laying wooden floors. New perimeter defences were constructed; machine-gun posts were built into the walls, disguised to look like part of the original structure, and an anti-tank blockhouse was built in the entrance of the Roman west gate. The main and postern gates of the inner bailey were blocked by concrete and brick walls, and anti-tank cubes were installed along the areas where the Roman curtain wall had collapsed. The main concern was that an invader could have captured the castle and used its interior as a strongpoint. It was intended that the new defensive measures at the castle would make it "100% tank-proof" and that an enemy would not be able to approach within 2,000 yards (1,800 m) of it. The United States Army Air Corps also used it as a radio direction centre from early 1944.

In 1945 the castle was returned to civilian control. The blockhouse and obstructions were demolished but it was decided to leave the machine-gun posts in place to illustrate the most recent chapter in the castle's history. The castle is now managed by English Heritage and is open to the public.

== Archaeological investigations ==
Pevensey Castle has been the subject of a number of excavations and archaeological investigations over the past 300 years. The first recorded excavation on the site took place in 1710, when the vicar of Pevensey sought to dig a channel from the castle's moat, within the outer bailey, to convey water to the village. The project necessitated digging under the Roman curtain wall. This revealed how the wall had been constructed, resting on a foundation of rubble-packed oak piles and beams which were described as exhibiting "no symptoms of decay, and even the leaves of some brushwood which had been thrown in were found equally well preserved."

The Sussex Archaeological Society, now the oldest archaeological society in England, was founded within the castle's walls on 9 July 1846. Six years later, two antiquarians, Mark Antony Lower and Charles Roach Smith, were granted permission by the Duke of Devonshire to carry out an excavation of the castle with the support of sponsors and the London, Brighton and South Coast Railway, which provided free transport. The excavations concentrated on the Roman west gate and north postern, with some small trial trenches dug elsewhere on the site. They began in August 1852 and continued until November, unearthing several 4th-century Roman coins, numerous stone catapult balls and the foundations of the chapel in the inner bailey. The castle well was also discovered around the same time by the castle's custodian.

Further excavations were carried out by Louis Salzmann between 1906 and 1908, concentrating on the north-west sector of the Roman fort, the east gate and the north postern. Harry Sands undertook the clearing of debris around the medieval castle keep in 1906 and more extensive excavations in 1910. Further clearing work took place under the supervision of the Ministry of Works in 1926 following the acquisition of the castle by the state. In 1936 Frank Cottrill carried out an eight-month excavation in the area of the outer bailey. B. W. Pearce excavated outside the Roman west gate in 1938 and cleared the moat of debris the following year. The Second World War ended any further work, and it was not until 1964 that limited exploration by Stuart Rigold took place outside the south-east postern of the inner bailey. In 1993–95, a team from the University of Reading led by Professor Michael Fulford carried out a series of excavations in the area of the keep and on the Roman fortress's east side. The excavations found dating evidence which indicated the Roman fort was built in the 290s, including a coin from the reign of Allectus, four decades earlier than the previously accepted date range for the fort's construction. In 2019 a geophysical survey of the outer bailey was carried out.

== See also ==
- Castles in Great Britain and Ireland
- List of castles in England
