= Abulci =

Roman auxiliary company

The Abulci were a Roman auxiliary company (numerus) mentioned in the Notitia Dignitatum (ca. 420) as composing part of the garrison of the Saxon Shore Fort of Anderida – the title of one position is listed as "Praepositus numeri Abulcorum, Anderidos" (The commander of the Company of Abulci at Anderida) (Notitia Dignitatum xxviii.20). The unit may have been recruited from the territory of Abula (now Ávila) in Hispania Tarraconensis, although a Gaulish origin has also been suggested.

Earlier the Abulci are mentioned by Zosimus among the forces fighting for Constantius II at the Battle of Mursa Major in 351 (τάγματος τών Άβούλχων), where their commander, Arcadius, was killed.(ii.51)

The Abulci were mentioned by Kipling in Puck of Pook's Hill ("A Centurion of the Thirtieth").
