= Portus Adurni =

Roman fort

Coordinates: 50°50′17″N 1°06′54″W

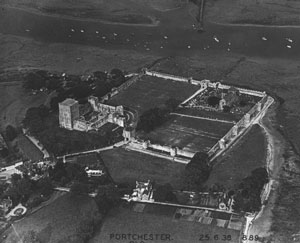
Photograph of Portchester Castle in June 1938 by Major George Allen (1891–1940). The square perimeter walls survive from the Roman period.

Portus Adurni was a Roman fort in the Roman province of Britannia situated at the north end of Portsmouth Harbour. It was part of the Saxon Shore, and is the best-preserved Roman fort north of the Alps. Around an eighth of the fort has been excavated.

It was later converted into a medieval castle known as Portchester Castle.

== Identification ==
The name Portus Adurni appears only in the list of Saxon Shore forts in the 5th-century Notitia Dignitatum, and the name is usually identified with Portchester, although it has occasionally been identified with the Roman fort at Walton Castle, Suffolk (which has now been washed away by the sea). Portus Adurni may be identical with the Ardaoneon listed in the Ravenna Cosmography, and Rivet and Smith derive both names from the British "ardu-" meaning "height". This derivation fits Portchester (which lies beneath Portsdown Hill) better than a flat location such as Walton Castle.

== Roman fort ==
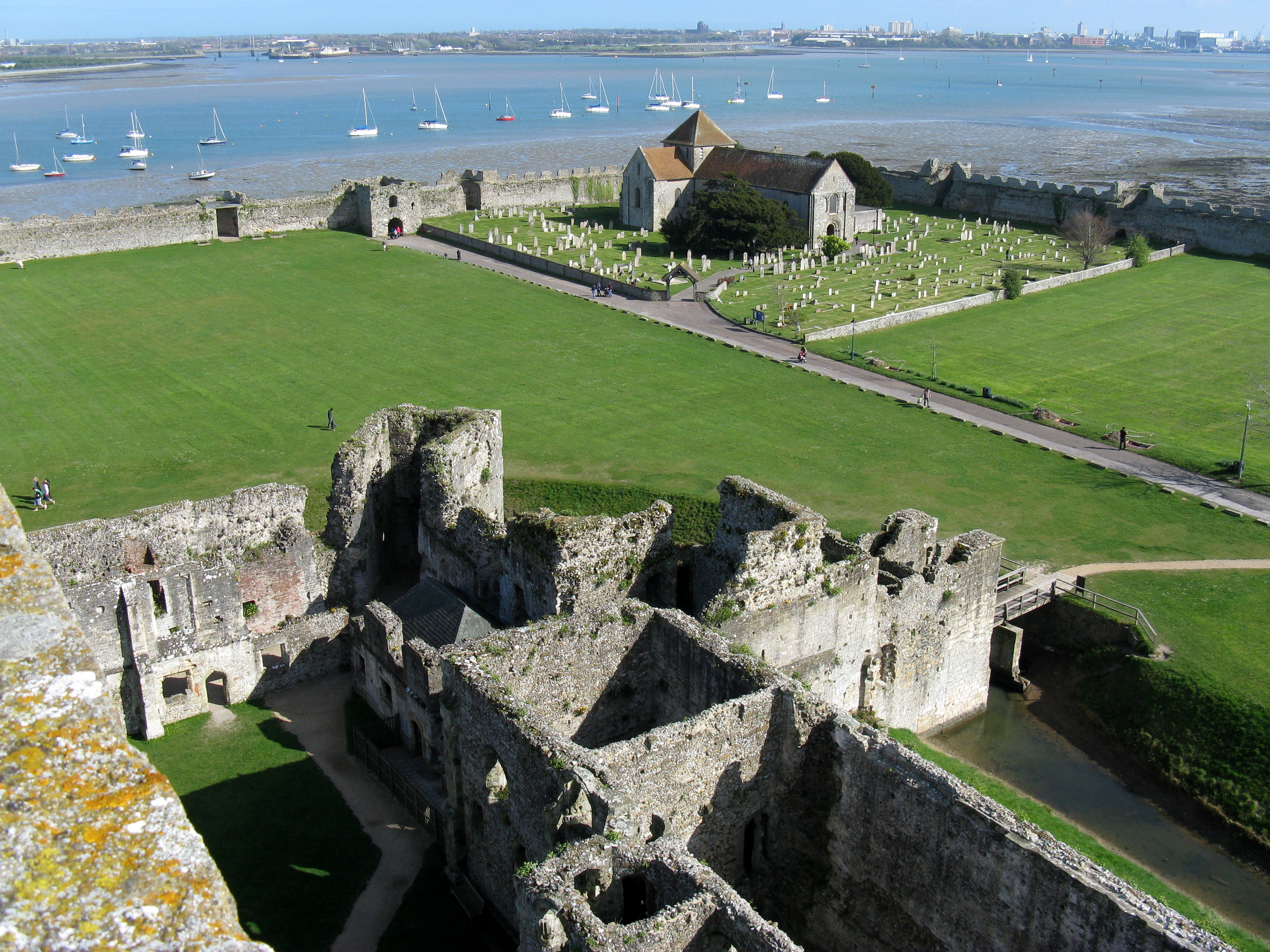
View from the later medieval castle towards the walls and bastions of the Roman fort, including the Saxon gate and Norman priory church

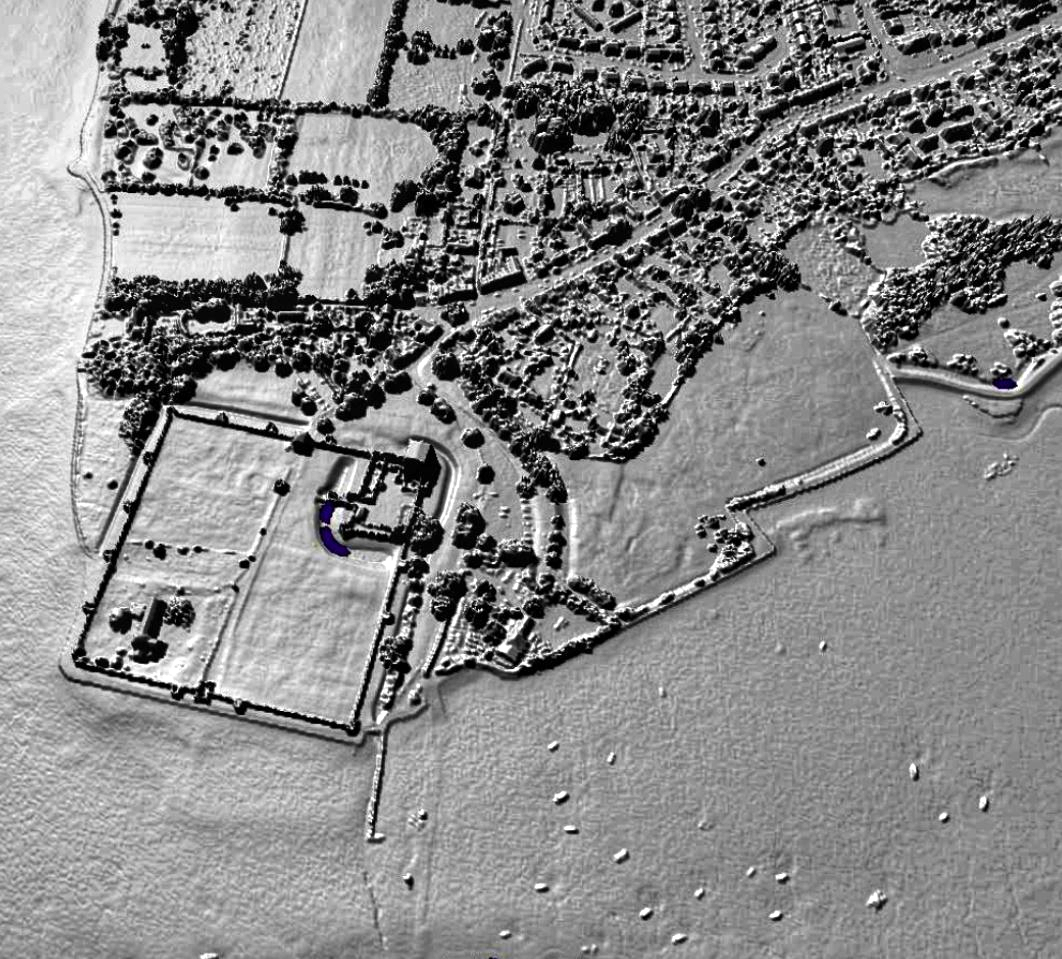
A lidar view of the fort and castle

The fort was built during the 3rd century as part of the so-called Saxon Shore forts to protect the southern coastline of Britain, possibly from Saxon raiders. It occupies a commanding position at the head of Portsmouth Harbour. The fort is square, enclosing an area of 9 acres (36,000 m^{2}) with outer walls 20 feet (6 m) high, 10 feet (3 m) thick, 210 yards (200 m) long and constructed of coursed flint bonded with limestone slabs. Square-shaped forts became widely used during the 3rd century, being highly practical and defensible. Portus Adurni has towers all along the walls, as well as towers that angle out at the corners. Historians feel this paramount concern for defensibility may reflect the seriousness of the Saxon raids during this time, or the defensive pressures of the Carausian Revolt (see below). The gates of Portus Adurni are of particular interest: they are indented inwards, so as to trap the enemy in an area exposed to walls on three sides; this technique became widely used from the Augustinian age to the fall of the Empire.

Unusually for a building of this period, most of the walls and bastions are complete. It has lost only four of its bastions. The walls themselves have been quarried to provide stone for later additions, but from the outside at least they appear much as they did when they were first erected. The walls were built in sections, by groups of gangs, which explains the different textures as you walk along the outer perimeter.

== History ==
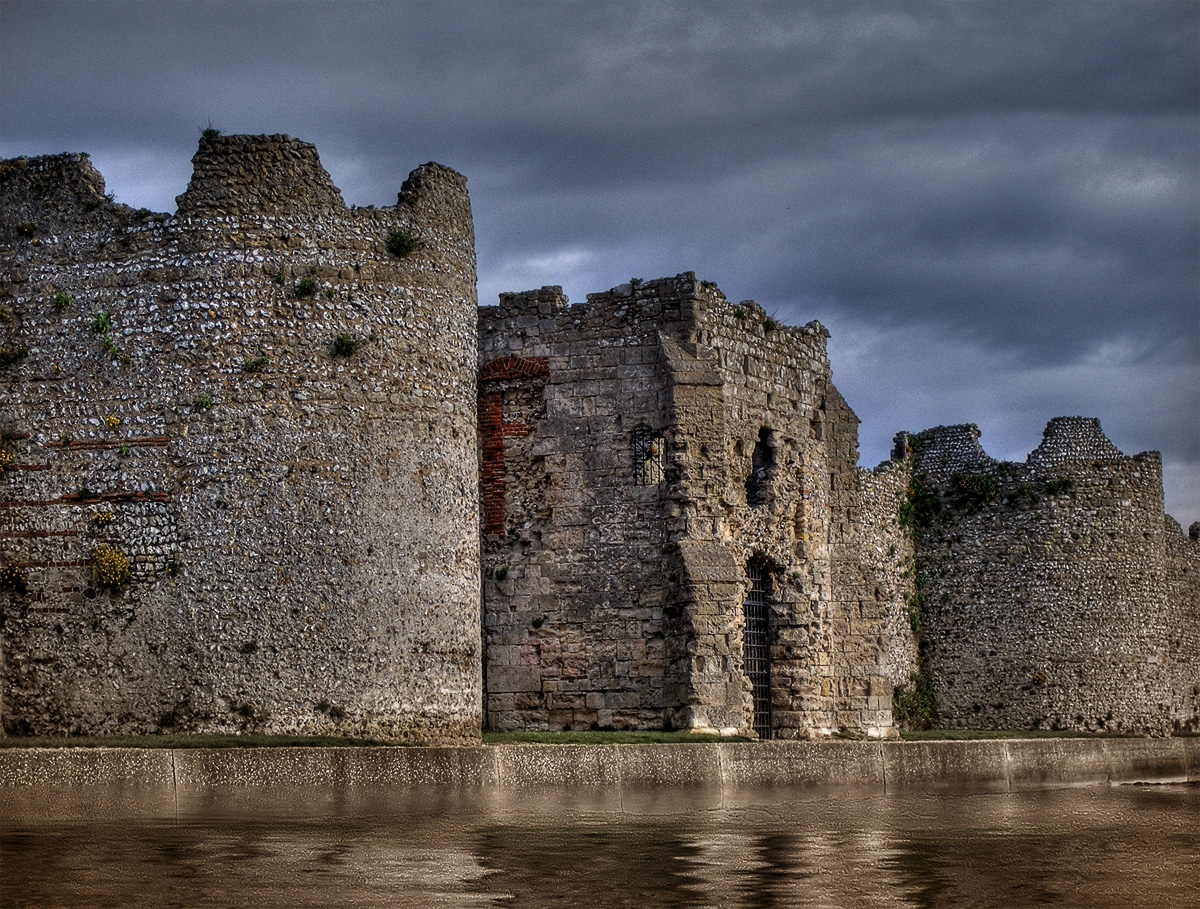
The fort's walls survive close to their full height.

The Saxon Shore forts, including Portus Adurni, were built during the mid to late 3rd century amid increased instability in north-eastern Gaul and the Rhineland, eventually leading to the Roman evacuation of that area. The forts were intended to maintain control over the region, and monitor shipping and trade, as well as defending against raids from across the English Channel. These forts became defensive holding points for the rebel Carausius, who in 285 was given the task of solving the Saxon piracy problem in the English Channel. When Carausius was charged with keeping the pirates' booty for himself, he retreated to Britain and proclaimed himself Emperor. The revolt went on for almost 10 years while other Roman generals tried and failed to dislodge him, until he was eventually murdered by Allectus, one of his aides, in 293, and Britain was finally taken back by 296. While some of the Saxon Shore forts were built under previous commanders and emperors, some were built by Carausius during his revolt and evidence suggests that Portus Adurni was built during this time; many of the coins uncovered at the site were minted by Carausius as emperor during his revolt.

== Anglo-Saxon high-status residence ==
Even after the departure of the Roman Army Portus Adurni's location and strong walls made it attractive as a fortress. The fort became an Anglo-Saxon high-status residence with great hall and tower. Later the Roman gateways were rebuilt as well. Portchester is listed as one of thirty-three fortified burhs in the Burghal Hidage, believed to date from the reign of Edward the Elder, who reigned from 899 to 924 AD.

== Later history ==
The circuit walls of the fort became the outer bailey wall of a Norman castle and later medieval palace. It was used as a gaol during the Napoleonic Wars. Its exceptional condition can therefore be attributed to the fact that, despite short periods of abandonment and longer periods of neglect, the fort was occupied for almost sixteen centuries. The site is owned by the Southwick Estate but managed by English Heritage, and is open to visitors throughout the year.
