= List of current places of worship in Wealden =

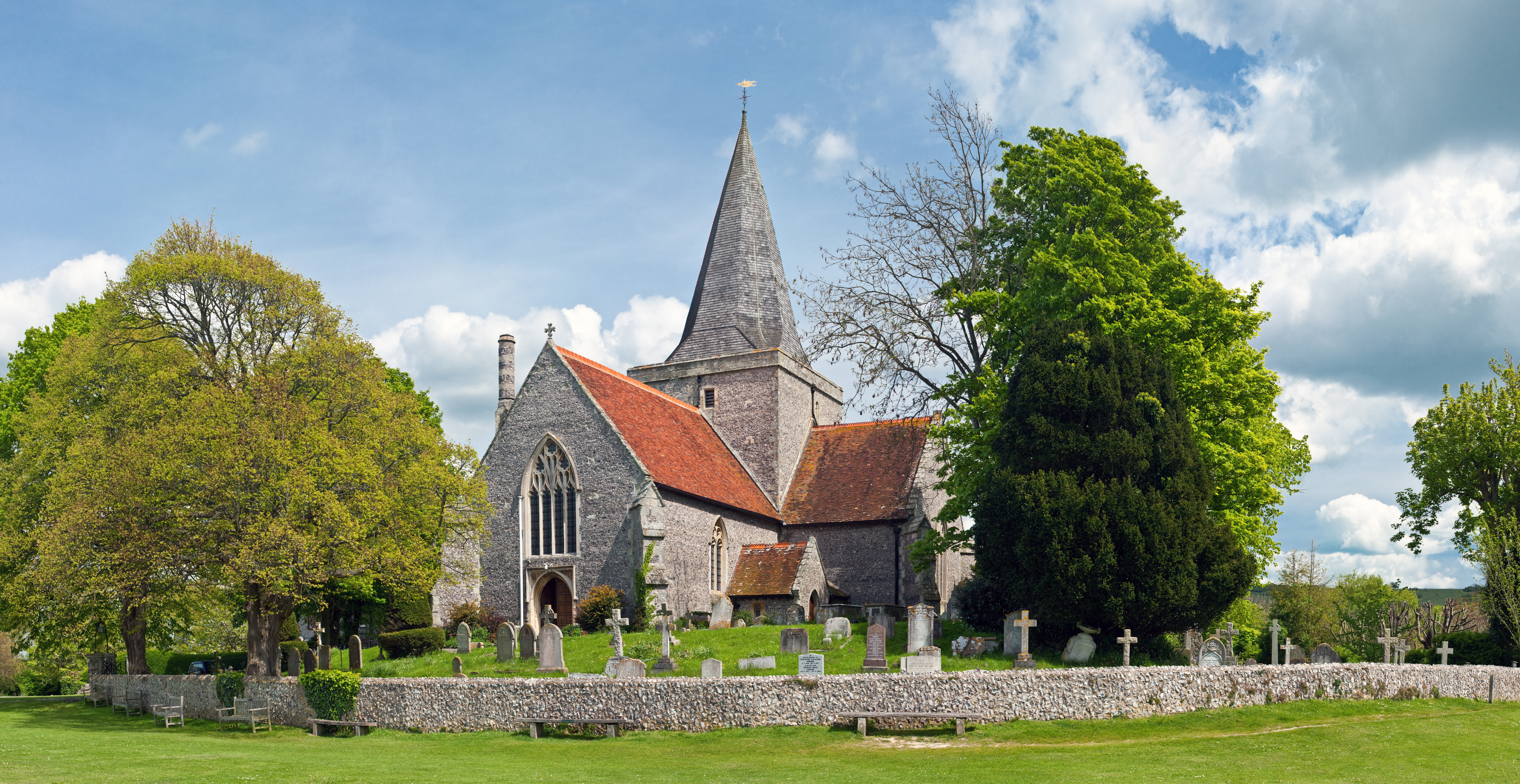
The "Cathedral of the Downs", St Andrew's Church at Alfriston, is an unrestored 14th-century Anglican church.

There are 134 places of worship in use across the district of Wealden, the largest of six local government districts in the English county of East Sussex. The mostly rural district, with five small towns and dozens of villages, has a 1,200-year documented history of Christian worship—a Saxon leader founded a church at Rotherfield in 790—and by the 19th century nearly every settlement had at least one church, as formerly extensive parishes were split up. Protestant Nonconformism, always strong in Sussex, flourished in the area now covered by the district: many Baptist, Methodist and Congregational chapels were built, and most survive. New churches continued to be built throughout the 20th century as the population grew. The district also has 50 former places of worship: their buildings survive but are now used for other purposes.

Historic England or its predecessor English Heritage have awarded listed status to more than 60 current and former church buildings in Wealden. A building is defined as "listed" when it is placed on a statutory register of buildings of "special architectural or historic interest" in accordance with the Planning (Listed Buildings and Conservation Areas) Act 1990. The Department for Digital, Culture, Media and Sport, a Government department, is responsible for this; English Heritage, a non-departmental public body, acts as an agency of the department to administer the process and advise the department on relevant issues. There are three grades of listing status. Grade I, the highest, is defined as being of "exceptional interest"; Grade II* is used for "particularly important buildings of more than special interest"; and Grade II, the lowest, is used for buildings of "special interest". As of February 2001, there were 47 Grade I-listed buildings, 106 with Grade II* status and 2,020 Grade II-listed buildings in Wealden.

== Location of Wealden and its places of worship ==
Wealden shown within East Sussex

Covering an area of 83,317 hectares (205,880 acres; 321.69 sq mi), Wealden is the largest of the six local authority areas in East Sussex, which has three small, highly urbanised coastal areas (the city of Brighton and Hove (Note: Brighton and Hove became a separate unitary authority in 1997, but is still part of the ceremonial county of East Sussex.) and the boroughs of Eastbourne and Hastings) and a large rural hinterland covered by three districts. Wealden is at the centre of these: the district of Lewes lies to the west and Rother is to the east. The borough of Eastbourne, to the south, is completely surrounded by the district. Wealden stretches the entire length of the county from the English Channel coast to the county boundaries of West Sussex, Surrey and Kent: it also has boundaries with the local authority areas of Mid Sussex, Tandridge, Sevenoaks and Tunbridge Wells.

Wealden's population at the time of the United Kingdom Census 2011 was 148,915. Five small towns—Crowborough, Hailsham, Heathfield, Polegate and Uckfield—account for about half of these people, and each has several places of worship catering for different denominations. The rest of the population is spread across dozens of villages and hamlets in the largely rural district. Many of these settlements have at least one church—often an ancient building on a site where worship has taken place for over a thousand years. St Wilfrid, exiled to Sussex in the late 7th century, and his near-contemporary St Cuthman rapidly Christianised the county, and the 111 churches described in the Domesday Book of 1086 was a significant underestimate.

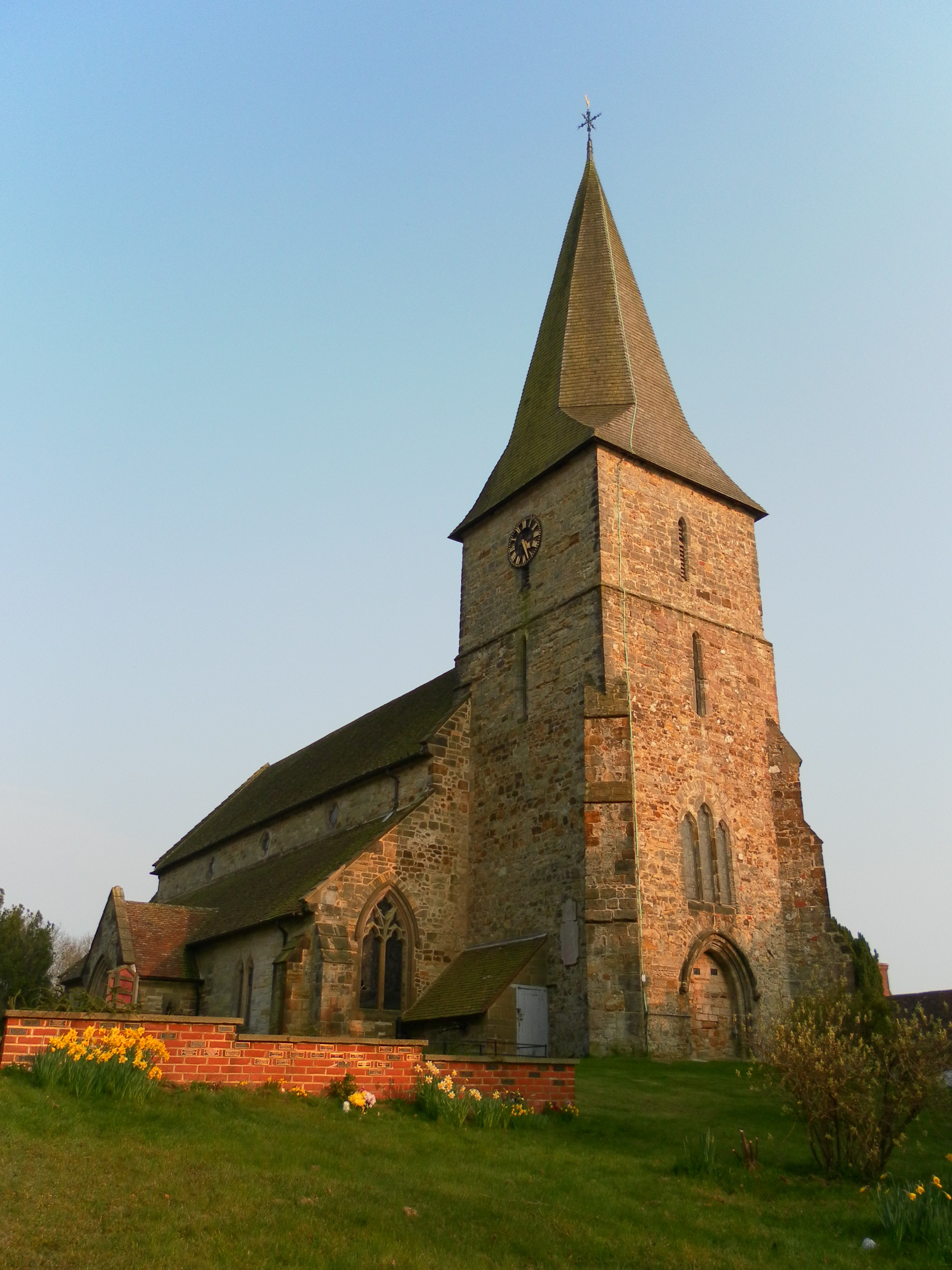
All Saints Church in Old Heathfield was built in the 14th century.

The oldest surviving church features in the district are from the Saxon era, found in a string of churches on the edges of the South Downs or in the flat plains around the River Cuckmere: at Arlington, East Dean, Friston and Jevington. Norman work survives in the churches at Alciston, Berwick, Hellingly, Herstmonceux, Isfield, Litlington, Little Horsted, Rotherfield (whose original church was founded in 792), Westdean, Westham and Wilmington. A rare Norman-era piscina survives at East Hoathly in an otherwise largely Victorian church, and at Hartfield a mostly late medieval church retains Norman masonry in one wall. Several Norman features survive at Maresfield but were moved around during Victorian restoration. Wadhurst's church was added to throughout the medieval era, but its Norman tower survives; and part of the Norman chancel survives at Pevensey in an otherwise mostly 13th-century church. Churches largely or wholly of that century—some of which replaced earlier buildings—can be found at Buxted, Chalvington, Chiddingly, Fletching (although Pevnser describes its tower as Norman), Folkington, Framfield (rebuilt in the 16th century after a fire), Lullington and Waldron. Features from the 13th century also survive at Hooe, Laughton, Ripe, Warbleton, Wartling and Willingdon, which were rebuilt or extended later in the medieval era, and at Ninfield in a church subjected to extensive 19th-century rebuilding. At Alfriston, the original Anglo-Saxon church was replaced in the 1360s by the vast cruciform "Cathedral of the Downs", whose flintwork is "some of the best in England". Also from that century is the church at Old Heathfield. Mayfield's ancient church (founded by Dunstan, the saint to which it is dedicated) is mostly 15th-century. English Anglican churches wholly of the 17th and 18th centuries are rare, but Withyham (rebuilt in 1680 after the predecessor burnt down) and Crowborough (newly built in 1744 and altered later) are represented in the district.

The 19th century was characterised by "an unprecedented upsurge" in the provision of new Anglican churches and the expansion of existing buildings, prompted by an increase in the competing attractions of Nonconformist denominations, a "quickening of religious feeling" in general and the huge increase in the population of towns. In some cases vast rural parishes were subdivided; in others, chapels of ease were provided in outlying rural areas distant from their parish church. Victorian restoration of old churches took place across the district and was particularly extensive at Hailsham, Selmeston and Uckfield, where the buildings are now essentially 19th-century. The era of large-scale churchbuilding (as opposed to restoration) in Wealden began in the late Georgian era with the opening of a new church in Frant, built between 1819 and 1822. The year 1836, just before Victoria's reign started, was significant: William Moseley was responsible for new churches in Forest Row and Hadlow Down that year (although the latter was greatly reworked in 1913); and Danehill, a main-road village in Fletching parish, also received its first chapel of ease in 1836. The present church of 1892 is by Bodley and Garner. It is the Victorian era that is most associated with the increase in churchbuilding activity, though. A church in the outlying part of Withyham parish close to the growing town of Crowborough opened in 1839. Four years later, a church was completed at Upper Dicker in Arlington parish; and prolific architect Richard Cromwell Carpenter's church at Nutley dates from 1845. The churches at Eridge and Tidebrook date from 1852 and 1856 respectively. James Piers St Aubyn designed a chapel of ease at Cross-in-Hand, the main settlement in Waldron parish, in 1863–64. A former school was converted into a chapel of ease in Mark Cross, part of Rotherfield parish, in 1873, although it was soon granted its own parish. A year later, work began on a church for the rapidly growing village of Polegate, and a church was built to serve the village of Horam in 1890. Endowments by rich benefactors allowed churches to be built at High Hurstwood (1872) and Hammerwood (1880). The wealthy Vicar of Brighton Arthur Wagner, who had a house in Buxted and established a convent there, also paid for the construction of a second church for the village in 1885–86. Fairwarp's church, designed in 1881 by Major Rohde Hawkins, was substantially extended in the 20th century, funded by the Eckstein baronets. Churches continued to be built throughout the 20th century. Examples include Blackham (1902), Jarvis Brook (1906), Colemans Hatch (1913, by Arthur Blomfield), Heathfield town (1915), Bodle Street Green (1923, replacing a fire-damaged one), Stone Cross (1924; a chapel of ease in Westham parish), Alderbrook (1957), Broad Oak (1959), Lower Willingdon (1962) and Pevensey Bay (1968, replacing one of 1881). In the east of Uckfield a tin tabernacle erected in 1904 was replaced by a combined church and sheltered housing development in 1971.

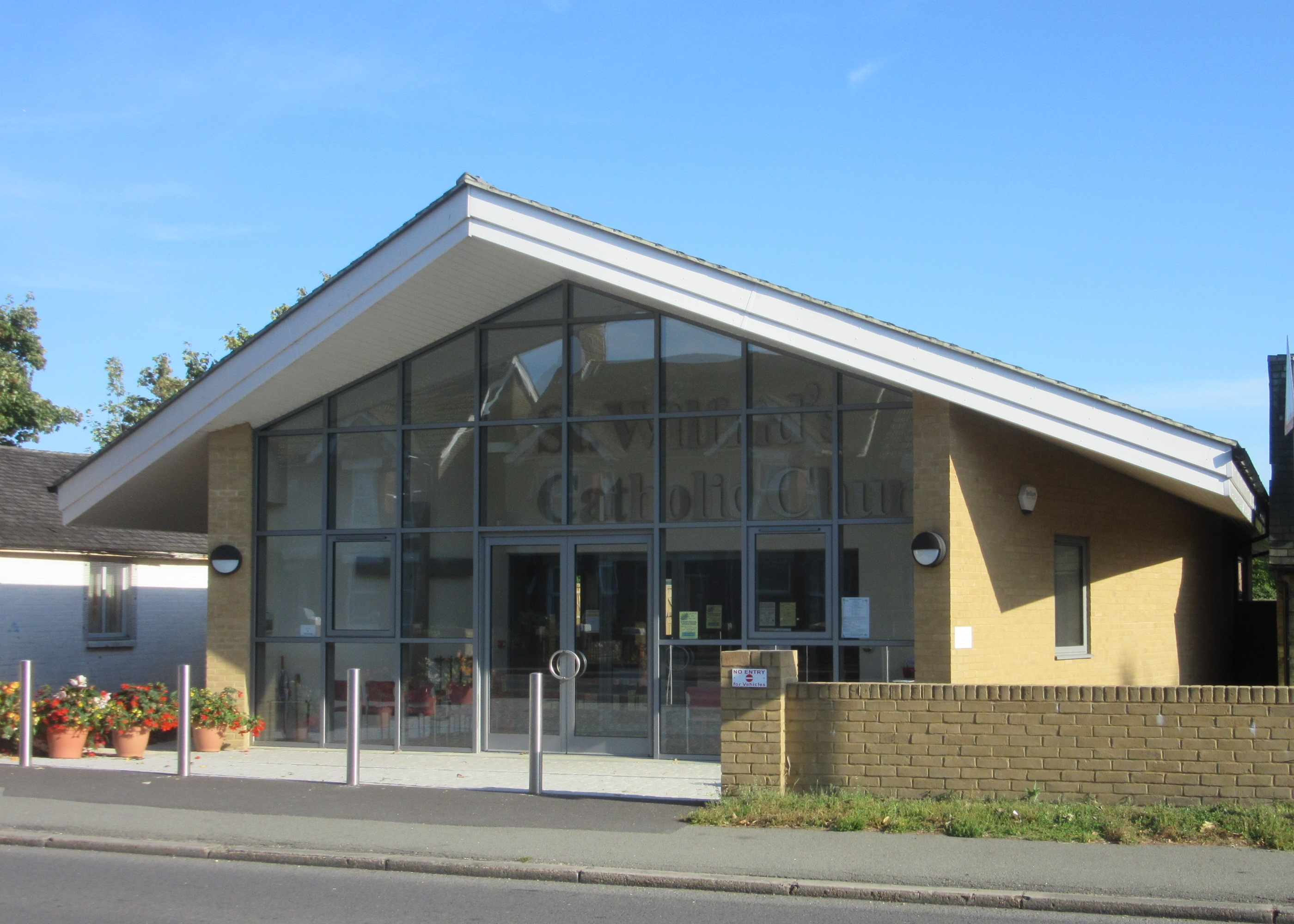
A new Catholic church was built in Hailsham in 2015.

Much of the southern and central part of present-day Wealden was covered by the vast Roman Catholic parish of the Our Lady of Ransom Church, Eastbourne. (Note: Villages served by the church in Eastbourne included Horam, Vines Cross, Warbleton, Punnett's Town, Three Cups Corner, Rushlake Green, Bodle Street Green, Wartling, Pevensey, Ripe, Golden Cross and Chiddingly, Hellingly, Herstmonceux, Lower Dicker and Upper Dicker, and the towns of Hailsham and Polegate until their churches were built and separately parished.) The strength of Protestant Nonconformism in the East Sussex countryside led to anti-Catholic feeling locally, and it was difficult to find suitable premises outside Eastbourne to celebrate Mass for the small number of Catholics in the area. Eastbourne's parish priest founded a Mass centre in Hailsham in 1917, and numbers of worshippers grew to the extent that the rented premises (the hay-loft of a brewery's stables) were swapped for a purpose-built church in 1922. The present St Wilfrid's Church dates from 2015. A church was also built in Polegate in 1938; St George's Church is now part of a joint parish with St Wilfrid's. The area around Uckfield has supported two Catholic churches since the late 19th century, in the town itself and at Heron's Ghyll; they are also joined as one parish. St John the Evangelist Church at Heron's Ghyll dates from 1896–97, but a Catholic mission was founded there 30 years earlier by poet Coventry Patmore. Frederick Walters, its architect, also designed Uckfield's first Catholic church; it was replaced by the present distinctive concrete-framed Church of Our Lady Immaculate and St Philip Neri, completed in 1958. Crowborough's church opened in 1911 and was enlarged in 1922. In Mayfield, an oratory dedicated to St Thomas of Canterbury in the convent school at the Old Palace was used for public Masses from 1932, although it was not formally registered for worship until 1946 and for marriages the following year. A permanent church of the same dedication was completed in 1957 to the design of prolific local architect Henry Bingham Towner. Catholic worship in the Wadhurst area was focused on the chapel at The Mount Novitiate House of Fathers of Charity, originally founded by Rosminians, but they built the present Church of the Sacred Heart in 1929 for use by the general public. St Catherine's Church was built in 1953 to serve Heathfield, but it has been demolished and local Catholics now worship at the chapel of a Benedictine convent in nearby Cross-in-Hand. Churches were also opened in Forest Row in 1958 (closed 2009) and both Pevensey Bay and Rotherfield in 1963 (closed 2016 and 2019 respectively). (Note: See List of former places of worship in Wealden for details of these churches.)

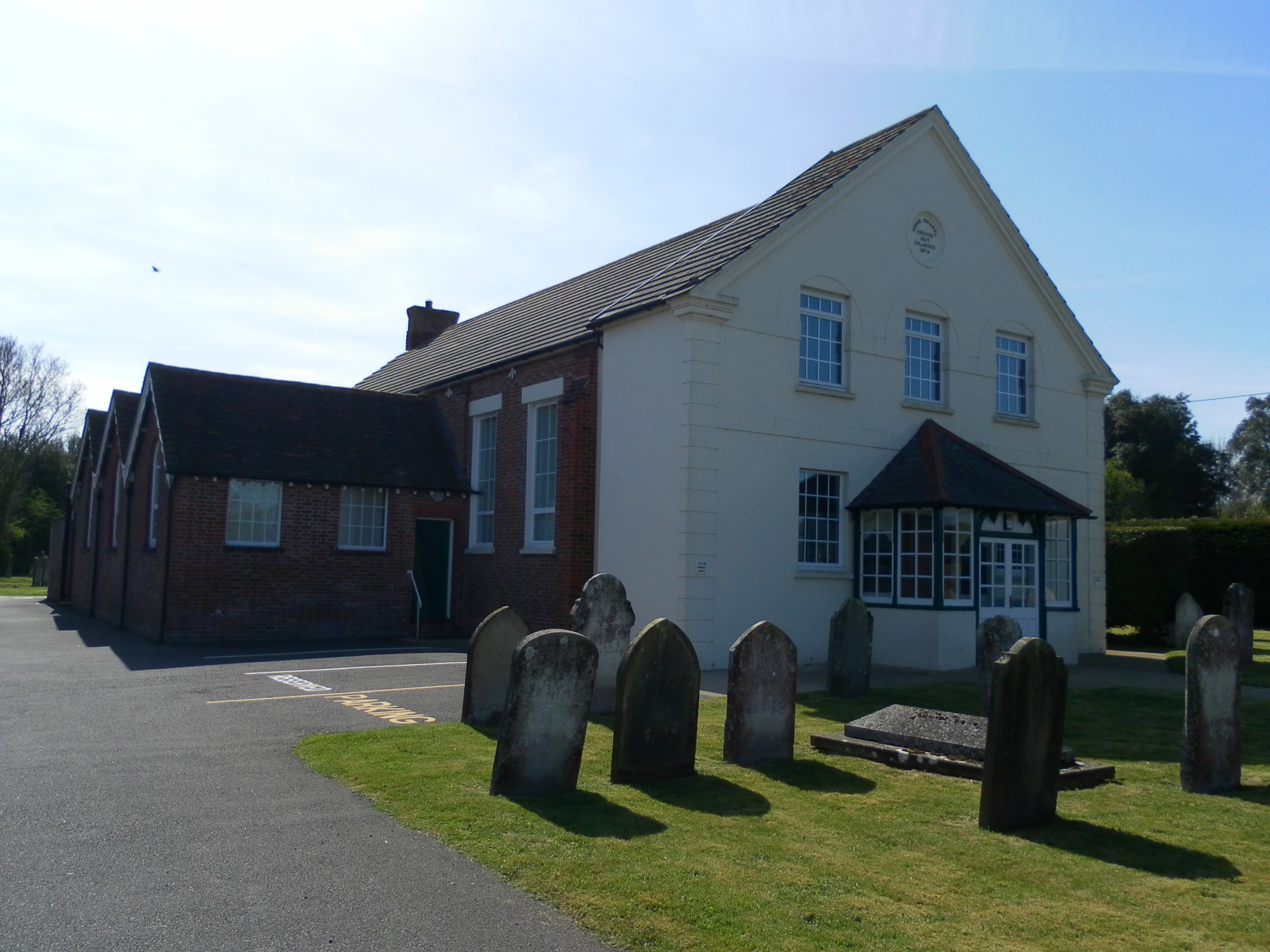
Zoar Strict Baptist Chapel dates from 1837.

The Methodist Statistical Returns published in 1947 (Note: The statistical return was compiled between 1940 and 1947 with the aim of documenting all Methodist chapels extant at that time: their location, previous affiliation prior to the Methodist Union of 1932, capacity, building materials and similar details.) recorded the existence of 17 Methodist chapels, all of Wesleyan origin, in present-day Wealden. Chapels at Blacknest, (Note: A hamlet in Westham parish, also known as Blackness.) Gamelands and Hailsham were part of the Eastbourne Circuit; the St Leonards and Bexhill Circuit looked after chapels at Lower Ninfield (Russell's Green) and Upper Ninfield; chapels at Boarshead, Crowborough, Groombridge, Hartfield and Rotherfield were in the Tunbridge Wells Circuit; and the Sussex Mission was responsible for the chapels at Blackboys, Buxted, Cross-in-Hand, East Hoathly, Laughton, Ridgewood, East Sussex and Uckfield. Those at Buxted, Cross-in-Hand, Gamelands, Hailsham and Upper Ninfield are still used for Methodist worship, and Methodist congregations still worship in Crowborough and Uckfield but share the United Reformed Church buildings in both towns. Another joint United Reformed and Methodist church exists in Lower Willingdon: originally built for Wesleyan Methodists, it was closed at the time of the Statistical Returns survey. Only one separate United Reformed church exists in the district, at Polegate (opened in 1904 as a Congregational chapel). A Congregational chapel built in 1811 in Herstmonceux declined to join the United Reformed Church when that denomination was formed in 1972 (incorporating most English Congregational chapels) and instead is part of the independent Congregational Federation; and the present Hailsham Free Church (now Evangelical) was originally registered for Congregationalists.

Churches with a Calvinistic character, whether independent or aligned with the doctrines of the Strict and Particular Baptists, have thrived since the 18th century. (The term "Strict Baptist" to describe a distinctively Calvinist interpretation of Baptist view developed in the 19th century "with the purpose of organising a range of Calvinistic Baptist causes within a denominational identity".) Sussex, and the east of the county in particular, is "particularly well endowed with wayside chapels" supporting these principles: such buildings are typically "modest in scale, neat ... [and] restrained", with a "quiet and unassuming elegance". The 800-capacity Zoar Strict Baptist Chapel at Lower Dicker, built in 1837, is the most prominent example; it was founded by members of nearby Golden Cross Chapel (1813), who had met locally for small-scale meetings of a Calvinist character since the late 18th century. Both chapels are still in use. Thomas Dicker, a member of a long-established local family, founded Five Ash Down Independent Chapel in 1784; his son was involved with the Strict Baptist churches at Uckfield and Hailsham. A member of Zoar left to take up the pastorate at Ebenezer Chapel at Bodle Street Green and changing its doctrines to Strict Baptist. Many Strict Baptist chapels in the district have closed, but others still in use—often for congregations established long before they were built—include the chapels at Blackboys (1875), Broad Oak (1859), Jarvis Brook (1876), Mayfield (1873), Pick Hill (1873) and Rotherfield (1858).

== Religious affiliation ==
According to the United Kingdom Census 2011, 148,915 people lived in Wealden. Of these, 64.01% identified themselves as Christian, 0.38% were Muslim, 0.16% were Jewish, 0.3% were Buddhist, 0.15% were Hindu, 0.02% were Sikh, 0.76% followed another religion, 26.29% claimed no religious affiliation and 7.94% did not state their religion. The proportion of Christians was higher than the 59.38% in England as a whole, and the proportions of people claiming adherence to another religion or no religious affiliation were also higher in Rother than nationally (the figures for England as a whole were 0.43% and 24.74% respectively). The percentage of people in Rother not answering this census question was also higher than the 7.18% nationally. Other religions named in the census had much lower proportions of followers than in England overall—the corresponding national percentages were 5.02% for Islam, 1.52% for Hinduism, 0.79% for Sikhism, 0.49% for Judaism and 0.45% for Buddhists.

== Administration ==
All Anglican churches in Wealden are part of the Diocese of Chichester, whose cathedral is at Chichester in West Sussex, and most are in the Archdeaconry of Lewes and Hastings—one of three subdivisions which make up the next highest level of administration. In turn, this archdeaconry is divided into eight deaneries. The churches at Hooe and Ninfield are in the Rural Deanery of Battle and Bexhill. Those at Bodle Street Green, Broad Oak, Cross-in-Hand, Hailsham, Hawkswood, Heathfield, Hellingly, Herstmonceux, Horam, Old Heathfield, Upper Dicker, Waldron, Warbleton and Wartling are part of the Rural Deanery of Dallington. East Dean, Friston, Jevington, Pevensey, Pevensey Bay, Polegate, Stone Cross, Westham and Willingdon's churches are in the Eastbourne Rural Deanery. The churches at Alciston, Alfriston, Arlington, Berwick, Chalvington, Folkington, Laughton, Litlington, Lullington, Ripe, Selmeston, West Dean and Wilmington are in the Rural Deanery of Lewes and Seaford. Those at Blackham, Coleman's Hatch, Crowborough (three churches), Eridge Green, Five Ashes, Frant, Groombridge, Hartfield, Jarvis Brook, Mark Cross, Mayfield, Rotherfield, Tidebrook, Wadhurst and Withyham are in Rotherfield Rural Deanery. Buxted's two churches and those at Chelwood Gate, Chiddingly, Danehill, East Hoathly, Fairwarp, Fletching, Framfield, Hadlow Down, High Hurstwood, Isfield, Little Horsted, (Note: The village and Church of England parish are also known as Horsted Parva.) Maresfield, Nutley and Uckfield are part of the Rural Deanery of Uckfield. Three churches in the north of the district—at Forest Row, Hammerwood and Holtye Common (now redundant)—are part of the Rural Deanery of East Grinstead in the Archdeaconry of Horsham.

The Roman Catholic Diocese of Arundel and Brighton, whose cathedral is at Arundel, administers Wealden's eight Roman Catholic churches. The churches at Hailsham and Polegate are in Eastbourne and St Leonards-on-Sea Deanery; and the other seven—at Crowborough, Heathfield, Heron's Ghyll, Mayfield, Rotherfield, Uckfield and Wadhurst—are in Mayfield Deanery. The churches at Hailsham and Polegate are part of a joint parish, as are Uckfield's and Heron's Ghyll's churches. Until its closure in 2019, the Catholic church at Rotherfield was part of a joint parish with Wadhurst in Rother District, also part of Mayfield Deanery.

The Central Sussex United Area, an ecumenical partnership between the Methodist Church and the United Reformed Church's Southern Synod, was formed in September 2007 to administer churches belonging to those denominations in an area bounded by Haywards Heath, Eastbourne and Crowoborough. The churches covered by this partnership are the Methodist churches at Buxted, Cross-in-Hand, Gamelands and Hailsham, the United Reformed Church at Polegate and the joint Methodist and United Reformed churches at Crowborough, Lower Willingdon and Uckfield. Ninfield Methodist Church is part of the 13-church Hastings, Bexhill and Rye Methodist Circuit.

Union Church in Heathfield and the Herstmonceux Free Church are part of the Congregational Federation, an association of independent Congregational churches in Great Britain. The federation came into existence in 1972 when the Congregational Church in England and Wales merged with several other denominations to form the United Reformed Church. Certain congregations wanted to remain independent of this, and instead joined the Congregational Federation. As of January 2021 there were 235 churches in the Federation.

Union Church and Welcome Baptist Church at Heathfield, Trinity Church at Lower Willingdon and the Baptist churches in Pevensey Bay and Uckfield (Note: Uckfield Baptist Church closed in 2015, but the congregation still meets in alternative premises.) are administratively part of the East Sussex Network of the South Eastern Baptist Association. Forest Row Baptist Church is covered by the Association's Gatwick Network. The district also has several Strict Baptist chapels which are part of the Gospel Standard movement: the chapels called Ebenezer at Bodle Street Green, Broad Oak and Horam (Pick Hill), Hope Chapel at Blackboys, Providence at Rotherfield, Rehoboth at Jarvis Brook, Zoar at Lower Dicker and the chapels at Mayfield and Foresters Hall in Uckfield.

Bells Yew Green Chapel and Hailsham Gospel Mission belong to the Countess of Huntingdon's Connexion—a small group of Evangelical churches founded by Selina Hastings, Countess of Huntingdon during the 18th-century Evangelical Revival—which has 22 churches in England, concentrated particularly in Sussex.

== Current places of worship ==
Current places of worship
Name	Image	Location	Denomination/ Affiliation	Grade	Notes	Refs
Alciston Church (More images)		Alciston; 50.8299°N 0.1368°E	Anglican	I	Much 12th-century work remains in this isolated church; it had links to Battle Abbey at that time. Remnants of a Saxon apse are also visible. The flint building has a wooden belfry and a late-19th-century timber-framed roof. Restoration was carried out in 1853. The chancel is mostly 13th-century.	
St Andrew's Church (More images)		Alfriston; 50.8066°N 0.1580°E	Anglican	I	This large cruciform church, known as the "Cathedral of the Downs", dates from about 1360 and has been only minimally altered: the spire was restored in 1905. The flintwork is extremely finely crafted. The lancet windows vary between two Gothic styles—Decorated and Perpendicular. Fittings include an Easter Sepulchre.	
St Pancras' Church (More images)		Arlington; 50.8462°N 0.1902°E	Anglican	I	A chiefly Anglo-Saxon flint church with some Early English and Decorated Gothic additions, this building has a 15th-century king post roof and faint remnants of wall murals. By 1850, the building was so dilapidated that it closed for restoration until 1893. Roman brickwork and remains of an earlier wooden and wattle-and-daub church have also been found.	
Bells Yew Green Chapel (More images)		Bells Yew Green; 51.1024°N 0.2969°E	Countess of Huntingdon's Connexion	–	Situated very close to the Kent border, and associated with the former Emmanuel Chapel at Tunbridge Wells, this chapel is attached to a house. It was built by the Countess of Huntingdon's Connexion Trust in 1879 (although it was not registered for marriages until August 1983), and has a rendered exterior.	
St Michael and All Angels Church (More images)		Berwick; 50.8239°N 0.1550°E	Anglican	I	This 12th-century church (with a much older font) has a famous set of wall murals—not contemporary with the building, but painted during World War II by Bloomsbury Group associates such as Duncan Grant and Vanessa Bell at the invitation of the Bishop of Chichester. Victorian restoration was prompted by the ruinous state of the church in the early 19th century.	
Hope Strict Baptist Chapel		Blackboys; 50.9490°N 0.1562°E	Strict Baptist	–	Built in 1875 and registered for marriages in April 1881, this red-brick Vernacular-style building is attached to a house. The walls are rendered. Since its inception it has catered for Gospel Standard Baptists.	
All Saints Church (More images)		Blackham; 51.1414°N 0.1405°E	Anglican	–	Architect Lacy W. Ridge designed this Gothic Revival church in 1902. The west end of the stone building has an octagonal belfry on the roof, appearing to balance on a buttress. All windows are lancets.	
St John the Evangelist's Church		Bodle Street Green; 50.9041°N 0.3466°E	Anglican	–	A church was erected in this hamlet in 1855, but there may have been an earlier chapel of ease (to Warbleton parish church) in the 1830s. Major Rohde Hawkins' original church burnt down in 1923, and Walter Tower designed a flint and stone Perpendicular Gothic Revival replacement with a wooden belfry.	
Ebenezer Strict Baptist Chapel		Bodle Street Green; 50.9102°N 0.3439°E	Strict Baptist	–	An Independent Baptist congregation was founded here in 1835 by a Horsham-based preacher. The present chapel is aligned to the Gospel Standard movement and was built in 1864, although it was not registered for marriages until November 1988. It is timber-framed, partly weatherboarded and rendered, and has been extended several times. There is a gable above the entrance porch.	
St George's Church (More images)		Broad Oak; 50.9762°N 0.2826°E	Anglican	–	This church, in the parish of Heathfield, dates from 1959. It is cruciform in shape and has wooden walls and a steeply pitched shingled roof with windows immediately below the eaves. The building also has a belfry.	
Ebenezer Strict Baptist Chapel (More images)		Broad Oak; 50.9784°N 0.2860°E	Strict Baptist	–	George Mockford, who founded this chapel, is buried near the porch of the red-brick Georgian-style building. There is a weatherboarded section to the rear, and the gable end has ornate bargeboards. Worshippers, who follow the Gospel Standard tradition, first met in 1843, but the chapel was built in 1859 and was registered for marriages in March 1873.	
St Margaret the Queen's Church (More images)		Buxted; 50.9876°N 0.1158°E	Anglican	I	Unusually dedicated to Saint Margaret of Scotland, this 13th-century church has stood isolated in Buxted Park since the 1830s, when the privacy-seeking Lord of the Manor forced occupants of the surrounding houses to move 0.5 miles (0.8 km) east to a new village. Victorian restoration obscures some of the original work.	
St Mary the Virgin Church (More images)		Buxted; 50.9913°N 0.1355°E	Anglican	II	Arthur Douglas Wagner, long-time Vicar of Brighton, founded many churches there, but this was the only one he established outside the town. He owned a house in the village, and founded a convent in 1883. Edmund Scott and F.T. Cawthorn's Decorated Gothic Revival flint and stone church has a tower and a barrel-vaulted roof.	
Buxted Methodist Church (More images)		Buxted; 50.9905°N 0.1356°E	Methodist	–	In 1907, the local Wesleyan Methodist community built a chapel on Buxted High Street. A coach-house on adjacent land had previously served as a place of worship; it survived until 1988, when the chapel was extended. The name Buxted Methodist Church was adopted in 1932.	
St Bartholomew's Church (More images)		Chalvington; 50.8636°N 0.1571°E	Anglican	I	A simple two-cell (nave and chancel) flint and stone church of the 13th century serves the hamlet of Chalvington. One window may have the oldest stained glass in Sussex, and the east window (inserted in 1400) has stained glass from about that date. A small belfry on the roof has a broach spire supported on a weatherboarded turret.	
Chelwood Gate Church (More images)		Chelwood Gate; 51.0490°N 0.0234°E	Anglican	–	This small church is part of the parish of All Saints Church, Danehill. It is next to the village hall in the hamlet of Chelwood Gate.	
Chiddingly Church (More images)		Chiddingly; 50.9062°N 0.1956°E	Anglican	I	The Perpendicular Gothic Revival tower bears the oldest of three stone spires in Sussex. The church dates from the mid-13th century, although the chancel is a Victorian rebuild of 1864. The aisled nave has old memorial tablets set into the floor. A private memorial chapel occupies the south transept.	
Holy Trinity Church (More images)		Colemans Hatch; 51.0855°N 0.0692°E	Anglican	II	Arthur Blomfield's Gothic Revival church, of local sandstone, has an apse, a tall tower with a steeple and some exterior half-timbering. The tracery in the lancet windows is reminiscent of the Decorated Gothic style. The building was finished in 1913.	
St Bartholomew's Church (More images)		Cross-in-Hand; 50.9716°N 0.2339°E	Anglican	–	The parish church at Waldron was closed for restoration in 1862, so worshippers gathered at Cross-in-Hand instead, and a resident offered land at Peat Wood for a chapel of ease to be built. J.P. St Aubyn's Decorated Gothic local stone building seated 200 people and was consecrated on 24 August 1863. A transept and vestry were added in 1901.	
Cross-in-Hand Methodist Church (More images)		Cross-in-Hand; 50.9730°N 0.2182°E	Methodist	–	Glovers Chapel—a barn attached to a farmhouse—was replaced by this purpose-built chapel for the Methodist community in 1895. Trayton Durrant's red-brick Early English-style building had stabling for the horses of itinerant preachers. The 150-capacity church opened on 24 January 1896 and was registered for marriages five years later. It is now in the Eastbourne Circuit.	
Holy Cross Chapel (More images)		Cross-in-Hand; 50.9717°N 0.2006°E	Roman Catholic	–	In 2014, this chapel within the grounds of the Holy Cross Convent opened for public worship as a Mass centre in the Catholic parish of Burwash. It replaced St Catherine's Church in Heathfield, built in 1953. The convent is occupied by an order of Benedictine sisters. The chapel was registered for marriages in August 2015.	
All Saints Church (More images)		Crowborough; 51.0554°N 0.1649°E	Anglican	II	Sir Henry Fermor paid for a church "for the use and benefit of the very ignorant and heathenish people" of Crowborough. The 1744 church was rebuilt in Neo-Norman style (with some Classical and Italianate elements) by Richard Whitfield and John Thomas at the request of Lord Abergavenny.	
Poundfield Hall (More images)		Crowborough; 51.0558°N 0.1797°E	Churches of God	–	Originally the Poundfield Meeting Room, this long-established Nonconformist place of worship was rebuilt in 2005 and now serves as a multipurpose community hall and Churches of God (Needed Truth Brethren) meeting place. The older building was registered for worship and for marriages in May 1952.	
Crowborough Community Church (More images)		Crowborough; 51.0606°N 0.1604°E	Evangelical	–	Originally an Episcopal Free Church of England place of worship called Christ Church, this was funded by local benefactor Elizabeth de Lannoy in 1879. Building work finished in 1883, two years after the church was registered for marriages. A rectory, lecture room and school building were built later. The Perpendicular Gothic Revival church has dormer windows in the roof, and is mainly of brick with some stonework. It is now occupied by a Newfrontiers-aligned charismatic Evangelical congregation.	
St Mary Mother of Christ's Church (More images)		Crowborough; 51.0540°N 0.1659°E	Roman Catholic	–	A church was built for Crowborough's Roman Catholic population in 1911 and was registered for marriages in March 1914. The brick and stone building, with a partly timbered tower supporting a small spire, faces All Saints Church across a green. Additions in 1922 included an attached presbytery, and the church was parished in that year.	
Crowborough United Church (More images)		Crowborough; 51.0531°N 0.1614°E	United Reformed Church/Methodist	–	This cost £2,000 to build in 1907: it was expensively endowed in memory of theologian Joseph Parker, and was originally called the Parker Memorial Congregational Church. The Queen Anne-style red-brick building, by Edward Knight, also has some external timberwork. Methodists joined the congregation after their church on Croft Road was closed. The chapel was registered for marriages in September 1907.	
All Saints Church (More images)		Danehill; 51.0297°N 0.0017°W	Anglican	II	George Frederick Bodley and Thomas Garner's Decorated Gothic stone church occupies a prominent, high position at the village crossroads. The large church, built in 1892 to replace a smaller brick and stone building of 1836 (by architect John Cowper) was parished in 1898: it took over parts of Fletching and Horsted Keynes parishes.	
Forest Hall (More images)		Dodd's Bank, Nutley; 51.0221°N 0.0658°E	Open Brethren	–	Locally nicknamed "The Chapel in the Woods" and located in the parish of Maresfield near Nutley village, this Brethren gospel hall was established in 1897 and was licensed for certifying marriages ten years later.	
St Simon and St Jude's Church (More images)		East Dean; 50.7580°N 0.2066°E	Anglican	I	The chancel, nave and thick-walled three-stage tower are mostly Norman with some Saxon material, although the church was extended in 1885 and 1961. The base of the tower formed part of the original nave: a rare arrangement. A porch was added in the 15th century, as was a king post roof, and the Jacobean pulpit dates from 1623. The churchyard has a Tapsel gate.	
East Hoathly Church (More images)		East Hoathly; 50.9249°N 0.1616°E	Anglican	II*	The castellated tower and its stair-turret are 15th-century Perpendicular Gothic, but the rest of the church was rebuilt in 1856 in Early English style. The nave has aisles on both sides. The small piscina may survive from a Norman church on the site.	
Holy Trinity Church (More images)		Eridge Green; 51.0989°N 0.2232°E	Anglican	II	Nikolaus Pevsner compared this long, low church to a school building. Its central entrance has a belfry above and leads directly into the nave. The Perpendicular Gothic Revival building, funded by the Earl of Abergavenny, is stone-built and dates from 1852. A later Marquess funded restoration in 1950.	
Christ Church (More images)		Fairwarp; 51.0217°N 0.0888°E	Anglican	II	The Eckstein baronets paid for a significant enlargement of this church in 1930: the main addition was a tower with a curious two-stage staircase and lancet windows. The Early English-style local stone building was designed in 1881 by Major Rohde Hawkins and has a windowless apse at the east end.	
Five Ash Down Independent Chapel (More images)		Five Ash Down; 50.9937°N 0.1033°E	Evangelical	–	Inspired by a "fiery sermon" preached in Uckfield, Thomas Dicker founded an Independent chapel on his father's land in 1784. The church which became Uckfield Baptist Church seceded the following year after doctrinal disagreements. The Early English-style building was given a new three-bay blue-brick façade (with contrasting quoins) in the 1870s. There is a graveyard in front of the building. A marriage licence was granted in September 1895. The congregation is now an Evangelical fellowship, independent of denominational links and based on Reformed ecclesiology.	
St Andrew's and St Mary the Virgin Church (More images)		Fletching; 50.9929°N 0.0349°E	Anglican	I	Fletching's parish church is of three eras: Norman architecture is represented by the tower, the body of the church (including its transepts) is 13th-century, and John Oldrid Scott carried out restoration—principally of the chancel—in 1880. Norman evidence can also be seen in the nave, where two unevenly placed windows are of that era. John Baker-Holroyd, 1st Earl of Sheffield built a mausoleum in the north transept; his friend Edward Gibbon is also buried in it.	
St Peter's Church (More images)		Folkington; 50.8128°N 0.2121°E	Anglican	I	This two-cell flint and stone church, without an arch between the chancel and nave, also has a timber-framed roof and a belfry with weatherboarded sides. The lancet windows are Perpendicular Gothic in style. Old box-pews survive inside, and Viscount Monckton has a memorial stone.	
Holy Trinity Church (More images)		Forest Row; 51.0981°N 0.0330°E	Anglican	II	William Moseley's church is an Early English Gothic Revival building of stone and ashlar, with a narrow tower and a small spire. Herbert Green's extensions of 1877–78 included an aisle on the south side of the nave. The barn-like wooden roof is intricate.	
Forest Row Baptist Church (More images)		Forest Row; 51.0952°N 0.0408°E	Baptist	–	The present chapel, with a roughcast exterior and Gothic appearance, was built in 1841, but a building for Baptists is believed to have existed in Forest Row as early as 1811. The windows are lancets. It was registered for marriages with the name Bethesda Chapel in June 1844.	
Christian Community Church (More images)		Forest Row; 51.0954°N 0.0383°E	The Christian Community	–	This is part of a now worldwide Movement for Religious Renewal, founded in Switzerland in 1922. The present church in Forest Row was opened on 12 September 1993, succeeding (and retaining the registration of) rooms in a building in nearby Ashurst Wood which were registered for worship in December 1964.	
St Thomas a Becket's Church (More images)		Framfield; 50.9626°N 0.1276°E	Anglican	II	The approach to this 13th-century church runs between well-preserved timber-framed medieval cottages. A fire in 1509 led to the church being rebuilt and extended, and the tower was remodelled in 1892 by B.E. Ferrey. A 1960s stained-glass window depicts children at play.	
St Alban's Church (More images)		Frant; 51.0982°N 0.2699°E	Anglican	II	Local architect John Montier designed a Perpendicular Gothic Revival church for Frant village in 1819. Work continued until 1822, and the chancel was extended in 1868. The 20th-century lychgate is hexagonal—an unusual design. Iron columns support a wooden gallery. The prominent tower is castellated. Some 15th-century stained glass has been inserted.	
St Mary the Virgin Church (More images)		Friston; 50.7625°N 0.1989°E	Anglican	I	Composer Frank Bridge is commemorated at this small, two-cell church, to which a single transept was added in 1892. The porch and king post roof are 15th-century; the chancel was renovated a century earlier. A Tapsel gate leads to the churchyard. Traces of Saxon material remain throughout.	
Gamelands Methodist Church (More images)		Gamelands, Horam; 50.9167°N 0.2420°E	Methodist	–	This red-brick chapel is on the road leading south from Horam. It was founded in 1900 by George Wheen, who had held services in his house for several years before that. The chapel, which is in the Eastbourne Methodist Circuit, was registered for marriages in June 1949.	
Golden Cross Chapel (More images)		Golden Cross; 50.8913°N 0.1861°E	Strict Baptist	–	Founded as Dunk's Chapel, this Vernacular red-brick chapel was built in 1813 to replace a nearby barn which had been used for Baptist meetings. It later became Little Dicker Chapel, but in 2004 the pastor had to change its name because "depraved" jokers repeatedly vandalised the nameboard to spell sexually suggestive words.	
St Thomas the Apostle's Church (More images)		Groombridge; 51.1107°N 0.1861°E	Anglican	II	New Groombridge—the Sussex part of this Kent-border village—is served by Norman Shaw's Perpendicular Gothic Revival church of local sandstone. Charles Eamer Kempe designed the stained glass, and H.S. Goodhart-Rendel was responsible for some internal fittings. The roof has a tiled belfry.	
Church of St Pius V (More images)		Groombridge; 51.1149°N 0.1854°E	Society of Saint Pius X	–	Built as a Wesleyan Methodist chapel in 1857, this Classical-influenced building was sold to the Traditionalist Catholic Society of Saint Pius X after it closed in about 1983 (although its marriage registration as a Methodist chapel, granted in February 1906, was not formally cancelled until August 1992). The windows and doorway in the three-bay façade are round-headed, and there are stuccoed quoins and a pediment. The chapel is mostly red-brick.	
St Mark's Church (More images)		Hadlow Down; 50.9967°N 0.1787°E	Anglican	II	William Moseley designed this parish church in 1836, but its present Perpendicular Gothic Revival appearance is attributable to George Fellowes Prynne's alterations of 1913. The tower rises straight from the west porch and is topped by a narrow spire. The nave has a Lady chapel with a version of the Madonna of the Magnificat.	
St Mary the Virgin Church (More images)		Hailsham; 50.8631°N 0.2603°E	Anglican	I	A medieval appearance is belied by major rebuilding in 1870 and 1889, when the church was given its consistent Perpendicular Gothic style. The buttressed tower is built of alternating flint and stone blocks. Inside, a 13th-century capital was probably moved here from nearby Michelham Priory.	
Hailsham Gospel Mission (More images)		Hailsham; 50.8610°N 0.2577°E	Countess of Huntingdon's Connexion	–	The Countess of Huntingdon's Connexion owns this place of worship on Hailsham's Station Road. Regular Sunday services are held. It was registered for worship in May 1982 and for the solemnisation of marriages in March 1984.	
ChristChurch (More images)		Hailsham; 50.8597°N 0.2508°E	Evangelical	–	ChristChurch is an Evangelical church associated with the Newfrontiers movement. Although it has occupied its church building on the Ropemaker Park industrial estate only since 2014, the community was founded in 1981 and previously worshipped in other venues.	
Hailsham Free Church (More images)		Hailsham; 50.8617°N 0.2561°E	Evangelical	–	This church was recorded as Congregational when it was registered for marriages in June 1909, but it now belongs to the Fellowship of Independent Evangelical Churches. It was built in a prominent position at the junction of Western Road and South Street in 1905, with space for a hall underneath. The free-style Renaissance building is of red brick with some stonework.	
Kingdom Hall (More images)		Hailsham; 50.8611°N 0.2588°E	Jehovah's Witnesses	–	This replaced an earlier Kingdom Hall on the town's Falcon Way, which closed in 1994. Its proposed demolition and replacement by flats in 2004 caused controversy and did not go ahead. The new building was registered for marriages in April 1996, and is used by the Hailsham Congregation of Jehovah's Witnesses.	
Hailsham Methodist Church (More images)		Hailsham; 50.8653°N 0.2570°E	Methodist	–	A late-20th-century porch is the main addition to the stuccoed Neoclassical chapel at the top of Hailsham High Street. There are three round-arched windows on the façade, each in a recess. The building dates from 1868 and was built for Wesleyan Methodists; it was registered for marriages in January 1885. It is now part of Eastbourne Methodist Circuit.	
Gordon Road Evangelical Church (More images)		Hailsham; 50.8593°N 0.2544°E	Open Brethren	–	This assembly of Open Brethren meet in a building previously known as Gordon Gospel Hall, under which name it was registered for marriages in June 1945.	
St Wilfrid's Church (More images)		Hailsham; 50.8605°N 0.2557°E	Roman Catholic	–	The present church, which opened on 31 October 2015, is the third on the site, although the other two buildings survive as well. Prolific local architect Henry Bingham Towner's first church—a "pleasant little" yellow-brick building with statues by Joseph Cribb and a shingled roof—opened in 1955, and additions were made in 1957 and 1966 (the high-quality oak porch dates from the latter year). It replaced an earlier building of 1922 on the same site, which survives as a meeting room. The 1955 building is now the church hall. The church's marriage registration dates from March 1953.	
Corinthian Church (More images)		Hailsham; 50.8654°N 0.2556°E	Spiritualist	–	This Spiritualist church and healing centre was founded in a building called Primrose Hall in Hailsham in 1993. Under that name it was registered for marriages in November 2000.	
Hailsham Baptist Church (More images)		Hailsham; 50.8608°N 0.2615°E	Strict Baptist	–	Hailsham's Strict Baptist community, established in 1792, worshipped in a wooden building from 1795 until a permanent brick and stone structure was built in the 1820s or 1830s. It was registered for marriages in March 1838. The present chapel is a 1909 rebuilding of the latter; the original wooden galleries and pulpit were retained though.	
Halland Chapel (More images)		Halland; 50.9300°N 0.1373°E	Baptist	–	A local man called Mr Matthews founded and built this red-brick chapel (originally called Halland Independent Chapel) in 1892. The Baptist congregation had formed in 1882; they met in a cottage at first. With the name Calvinistic Independent Chapel it was registered for marriages in August 1901.	
St Stephen's Church (More images)		Hammerwood; 51.1368°N 0.0559°E	Anglican	II*	Architect E.P. Loftus Brock was responsible for this church near Hartfield, which was funded by banker Oswald Smith. It was parished from its opening in 1880: territory came from East Grinstead and Hartfield parishes. Standing on a "fine site", the stone Early English-style church has a buttressed tower with a spire and Clayton and Bell stained glass. In November 2016 it was upgraded to Grade II* listed status.	
St Mary the Virgin Church (More images)		Hartfield; 51.1017°N 0.1120°E	Anglican	I	The north wall is the oldest part of this church: it has Norman masonry and a 13th-century trefoil-headed lancet window, now blocked. An arcaded aisle was added to the 13th-century nave a century later; the buttressed tower, with a broach spire, is 15th-century. There is no chancel arch: it may have been removed during 16th-century rebuilding. The lychgate is built into a medieval cottage—a very rare form.	
Emmanuel Church (More images)		Hawkswood, Hailsham; 50.8762°N 0.2608°E	Anglican	–	The parish of this modern Anglican church, carved out of Hailsham parish in 2005, covers the northern suburbs of Hailsham and the hamlet of Magham Down.	
St Richard's Church (More images)		Heathfield; 50.9667°N 0.2573°E	Anglican	–	Granville Streatfeild designed this town-centre church in 1915. It is of red brick with lancet windows, the largest of which are Perpendicular Gothic in style. The building has a chancel, nave with aisles on each side and a thin chimney. Most building materials are local. Extensions were made in 1963.	
Welcome Evangelical Baptist Church (More images)		Heathfield; 50.9650°N 0.2576°E	Baptist	–	Opened in 1886 as the Gilbert Memorial Chapel (commemorating the "Sussex Apostle" George Gilbert, who founded about 40 Baptist churches in East Sussex), this Independent Baptist chapel was given a new red-brick Renaissance-style façade in the 20th century. The original walls can still be seen behind this. With the name Welcome Mission Hall it was registered for marriages in August 1909.	
Union Church (More images)		Heathfield; 50.9712°N 0.2505°E	Baptist/ Congregational Federation	–	Edward Knight's church, on a prominent corner site at the top of the High Street, dates from 1899–1900 and is an Early English Gothic Revival-style building of red brick with stone dressings. It was registered for marriages in July 1904.	
King's Church (More images)		Heathfield; 50.9707°N 0.2510°E	Evangelical	–	This Evangelical church, based at the State Hall in the centre of Heathfield, is aligned with the Evangelical Alliance and the Newfrontiers movement. It has its origins in the 1980s, but the current premises were registered for worship in January 1998 and for marriages in June 2005.	
St Peter and St Paul's Church (More images)		Hellingly; 50.8886°N 0.2462°E	Anglican	I	The oldest parts are 12th-century, but the church stands on a pre-Christian burial mound. The tower has a Georgian appearance but is later than that era: it was rebuilt in 1836. A brass monument of a woman in a head-dress dates from the 1440s; it was found during Victorian restoration work.	
St John the Evangelist's Church (More images)		Heron's Ghyll; 51.0231°N 0.1115°E	Roman Catholic	II	This remote church, an ashlar Gothic Revival building of 1896–97 by Frederick Walters, is heavily buttressed and has a central tower above the nave and chancel. The 14th Duchess of Norfolk lived at nearby Heron's Ghyll House, where Mass had been celebrated from 1866 (when Coventry Patmore owned it); her grandson paid for the church to be built. It was registered for marriages in November 1897.	
All Saints Church (More images)		Herstmonceux; 50.8678°N 0.3331°E	Anglican	I	The church stands near the castle but distant from the village. The tower and one wall are 12th-century, but an older church stood on the site. Monuments to the 8th and 9th Barons Dacre and Sir William Fiennes demonstrate a long connection with the aristocracy.	
Herstmonceux Free Church (More images)		Herstmonceux; 50.8855°N 0.3279°E	Congregational Federation	II	Built as a Congregational chapel in 1811, this "pretty" (to Pevsner) Classical-style building stands at Chapel Cross, 1.4 miles (2.3 km) from Herstmonceux. It has grey and red brickwork, now painted over round-headed windows and an open pediment above a porch. Mid 19th-century additions included a Sunday school and wooden galleries. Following the passing of the Marriage Act 1836, which came into effect on 1 January 1837, it was registered for the solemnisation of marriages that September.	
Herstmonceux Friends Meeting House (More images)		Herstmonceux; 50.8905°N 0.3200°E	Quaker	–	Quaker meetings have been held in the village since 1713. Although the present building has a 19th-century appearance as a result of an extension and remodelling in 1898–99, its origins lie in a low rectangular chapel of 1734 which survives behind the gabled two-storey cottage-style brick façade. Inside, there is a 1734 date-stone above a blocked door. The attached burial ground was closed to new burials in 1897.	
Holy Trinity Church (More images)		High Hurstwood; 51.0184°N 0.1298°E	Anglican	II	Politician Francis Venables-Vernon-Harcourt's wife Lady Catherine paid for this remote church near her home at Buxted (Pevsner said its flower-ringed valley setting was "Arcadia indeed"). An unknown architect designed it in 1870–72, and a half-timbered tower was added in 1903. Some of the lancet windows have tracery.	
St Oswald's Church (More images)		Hooe; 50.8576°N 0.3895°E	Anglican	I	Standing apart from its village—perhaps because the centre of population was forced away by the Black Death—this Perpendicular sandstone church was restored in the 15th century but retains 12th-century work in the chancel and its side chapel. The east window has ancient stained glass depicting the Coronation of the Virgin.	
Christ Church (More images)		Horam; 50.9316°N 0.2446°E	Anglican	–	Percy Monkton's small church of 1890 was to have been replaced by an expansive new building less than 25 years later—but these plans were never followed through, and the red-brick Gothic-style building remains. It has a belfry and lancet windows, and there is evidence of later extensions.	
Horam Chapel (More images)		Horam; 50.9353°N 0.2443°E	Evangelical	–	This modern building stands in the centre of Horam village. It was registered for worship and for marriages in February 1996 in place of the former Gospel Hall in Maynard's Green, which had closed.	
St Margaret's Church (More images)		Isfield; 50.9445°N 0.0539°E	Anglican	I	Many members of the Shurley family, including John Shurley (d. 1527), are buried in their own chapel which forms a transept at this church. One 13th-century lancet window survives in the nave, and some other features are Decorated Gothic. Work in 1893 included the addition of a belfry and spire to the mostly Norman tower. A good example of a hagioscope survives in the chancel.	
St Michael and All Angels Church (More images)		Jarvis Brook; 51.0463°N 0.1904°E	Anglican	–	A school built in 1880 was used for worship until J.B. Tansley's stone and timbered chapel of ease to Crowborough parish church was completed in 1906 at a cost of £2,000. William Nevill, 1st Marquess of Abergavenny donated the land. The nave has lancet windows and no aisles, and there is a bellcote.	
St Richard's Church (More images)		Jarvis Brook; 51.0418°N 0.1713°E	Anglican	–	Another church associated with All Saints in Crowborough, this brick building (originally called St Richard's Hall) was finished in 1957 and serves the Alderbrook area near Jarvis Brook. Extensions have been built since the church opened.	
Rehoboth Chapel (More images)		Jarvis Brook; 51.0417°N 0.1806°E	Strict Baptist	–	This red- and blue-brick building dates from 1876. Its Gospel Standard Strict Baptist congregation, maintains links with the Forest Fold chapel on the other side of Crowborough. Seceders from that chapel founded the Jarvis Brook cause in 1852; they met in a schoolroom at first. The chapel was registered for the solemnisation of marriages in November 1893.	
Kingdom Hall (More images)		Jarvis Brook; 51.0484°N 0.1864°E	Jehovah's Witnesses	–	The Crowborough Congregation of Jehovah's Witnesses registered a hall off Crowborough Hill in July 1967. It was replaced by the present Kingdom Hall in March 1992.	
Jarvis Brook Memorial Hall (More images)		Jarvis Brook; 51.0484°N 0.1868°E	Spiritualist	–	This hall has been used as a Nonconformist place of worship for many years. Its present congregation is affiliated with the United Spiritualists movement.	
St Andrew's Church (More images)		Jevington; 50.7921°N 0.2140°E	Anglican	I	The substantial tower of this ancient village's church is 10th-century, and other Saxon evidence is visible in two blocked windows, which reused Roman material. St Lewinna, a 7th-century martyr, was allegedly buried here; her remains were apparently stolen in 1058. The rest of the church is 13th-century and in the Early English style. A porch was built in 1873.	
All Saints Church (More images)		Laughton; 50.8931°N 0.1325°E	Anglican	I	Mostly Perpendicular Gothic, with a 13th-century nave and a castellated tower, this church is most famous for its association with the Pelham baronetcy. Many family members are buried here, including two prime ministers: Henry Pelham and the 1st Duke of Newcastle. The chancel is 18th-century, and the porch is Victorian.	
St Michael the Archangel's Church (More images)		Litlington; 50.7971°N 0.1603°E	Anglican	I	A simple building with nave, chancel and spire-topped weatherboarded bell-tower, Litlington's church is mostly 12th-century. Other ancient features include three sundials, a 13th-century piscina and sedile, an Easter sepulchre, a 15th-century bell and one very old stained-glass window. Restoration in 1863 added a multicoloured tiled floor.	
St Michael and All Angels Church (More images)		Little Horsted; 50.9453°N 0.0919°E	Anglican	II	This hamlet near Uckfield is also called Horsted Parva. Its church, with a prominent ashlar Perpendicular Gothic Revival tower, was expensively restored in the Early English style by George Gilbert Scott in 1863. An arcade of four blocked windows (called "a remarkable motif" by Pevsner) in the chancel wall may be Saxon.	
Zoar Strict Baptist Chapel (More images)		Lower Dicker; 50.8790°N 0.2270°E	Strict Baptist	–	Originally called The Dicker Chapel, this 400-capacity building dates from 1837 and was registered for marriages seven years later. On a main road in a remote spot, it serves a wide area and had extensive stables for worshippers arriving on horseback. The Classical-style stuccoed brick chapel, enlarged and refronted in 1874, has a pediment, porch and pilasters.	
St Wilfrid's Church (More images)		Lower Willingdon; 50.8107°N 0.2411°E	Anglican	–	This Eastbourne suburb is served by this church within the parish of Polegate's St John's Church (but independent from it since 2002). It was established in 1962. Worship is in the Conservative Evangelical tradition of the Church of England, and the church belongs to the Fellowship of Confessing Anglicans and the Evangelical Alliance.	
Trinity Church (More images)		Lower Willingdon; 50.8081°N 0.2470°E	Baptist/Methodist/ United Reformed Church	–	Now used by three denominations, this red-brick church was built in 1894 for Methodists. Like many churches in the Eastbourne area, it suffered bomb damage in World War II and closed for several years for reconstruction. The windows are lancets, and there is exterior stonework. It was registered for marriages with the name Willingdon United Free Church in July 1939.	
Life Christian Centre (More images)		Lower Willingdon; 50.8120°N 0.2460°E	Pentecostal	–	This church, previously known as Downs Valley Apostolic Church, serves the Pentecostal and Apostolic communities in the Eastbourne area, and offers two services on Sundays. It was originally built as an Evangelical church, but by 1981 the building was vacant. That spring the owner gave it to the Apostolic Church, and it was reopened as Downs Valley Apostolic Church on 5 April 1981.	
Church of the Good Shepherd (More images)		Lullington; 50.8069°N 0.1676°E	Anglican	I	"Not easily forgotten", according to Nikolaus Pevsner, this tiny building—merely part of the chancel of the original church—is often called the smallest church in England: it is 256 sq ft (24 m^{2}) and holds 20 people. The old foundations survive near the entrance. What remains is Early English in style, dating from the 13th/14th century. A wooden belfry was added in 1806.	
St Bartholomew's Church (More images)		Maresfield; 50.9969°N 0.0875°E	Anglican	I	The large Perpendicular-style tower is 15th-century, and Norman work is visible in a window and around the north door, but John Oldrid Scott's restoration of 1875–79 gave Maresfield's church its present appearance. He realigned the interior: the original chancel arch now leads to the north transept, and the east window now faces south. Interior fittings include an 18th-century pulpit.	
St Mark's Church (More images)		Mark Cross; 51.0590°N 0.2571°E	Anglican	–	E.E. Cronk converted this former school (built in 1851) into a church in 1873. It was within the parish of Rotherfield until 1874, when it was given its own parish from parts of Wadhurst and Rotherfield. A very large east window was the main structural alteration to the stone and brick building.	
St Dunstan's Church (More images)		Mayfield; 51.0207°N 0.2606°E	Anglican	I	Dunstan himself built a wooden church on the site in the 10th century. Its stone replacement burnt down in 1389 and was rebuilt in the Perpendicular style, although the stubby tower and its spire retain their 13th-century appearance. The church has a wooden chancel arch ceiling with prominent moulding.	
Mayfield Baptist Chapel (More images)		Mayfield; 51.0196°N 0.2583°E	Strict Baptist	–	This 250-capacity building has a much smaller congregation than in its 19th-century heyday, but remains in use. It has stood on its village-centre corner site since 1873 (and was registered for marriages two years later), but Baptist worship in the Mayfield area has a much longer history.	
Colkins Mill Church (More images)		Mayfield; 51.0201°N 0.2561°E	Evangelical	–	This mid-19th-century Wesleyan Methodist chapel became a Congregational church in 1869. It closed in 1984, by which time it was a United Reformed church; but the lancet-windowed stucco and stone chapel was immediately bought by members of the Evangelical chapel at nearby Colkins Mill, who moved in and renamed it. It was formally registered in June 1992.	
St Thomas of Canterbury's Church (More images)		Mayfield; 51.0198°N 0.2535°E	Roman Catholic	–	Henry Bingham Towner, a prolific designer of Roman Catholic churches in Sussex, replaced a 1932 building with this simple Gothic Revival flint and ashlar church in 1957. It is low and long, with a saddleback roof. Two modern stained glass windows have been inserted. The church was registered in October 1957.	
St Mary the Virgin Church (More images)		Ninfield; 50.8849°N 0.4226°E	Anglican	I	An ancient yew tree survives in the churchyard, but the Saxon church which stood alongside it has gone; the present building has 13th- and 17th-century work, but a major restoration (possibly by Arthur Blomfield) in the 1880s obscures it. The south porch is of brick, unusually, and dates from 1735. The clapboard belfry of 1897 holds a 14th-century bell.	
Ninfield Methodist Church (More images)		Ninfield; 50.8858°N 0.4242°E	Methodist	–	The foundation stone of this red-brick chapel in the centre of Ninfield identifies William Booth's wife Catherine as the founder. The building dates from 1871, but was registered under the name Christian Mission Hall between February 1872 and July 1933.	
St James the Less Church (More images)		Nutley; 51.0323°N 0.0549°E	Anglican	–	Richard Cromwell Carpenter, who was responsible for many Gothic Revival churches, was commissioned to design Nutley's church in 1845. His steep-roofed stone building was extended in 1871 by the addition of a Decorated Gothic-style north aisle. The west end has a small bellcote.	
All Saints Church (More images)		Old Heathfield; 50.9599°N 0.2749°E	Anglican	II*	Little has changed at this sandstone church since the 14th century. The tower, with a broach spire, is slightly older and is built of chalk with sandstone on the exterior. Restoration in the 1890s eliminated galleries which had been installed earlier in the century: a large capacity was no longer needed because the vast parish had become smaller as new churches had been built. Former vicar Robert Hunt, a founder of Jamestown, Virginia, is commemorated by a stained-glass window.	
St Nicolas' Church (More images)		Pevensey; 50.8196°N 0.3368°E	Anglican	I	This church has stood next to Pevensey Castle since the 12th century, but the only original material from that time is part of the chancel. The rest was rebuilt in the 13th century and—in the case of the porch and the tower's top stage—the Victorian era (by George Gilbert Scott Jr.). The building is a good example of the Early English Gothic style.	
St Wilfrid's Church (More images)		Pevensey Bay; 50.8117°N 0.3507°E	Anglican	–	The original church—a red-brick and stone building of 1881—was demolished in 1971, three years after its replacement was built nearby. The low modern structure has an attached hall which is used for most of Pevensey Bay's social activities.	
Pevensey Bay Baptist Church (More images)		Pevensey Bay; 50.8120°N 0.3505°E	Baptist	–	Another modern replacement church, this building dates from 1982 and stands on the site of its 1906 predecessor. The congregation is now aligned to the Baptist Union of Great Britain, but has been associated with the Free Church for most of its existence. Its marriage registration was granted in February 1984.	
Ebenezer Strict Baptist Chapel (More images)		Pick Hill, Horam; 50.9205°N 0.2282°E	Strict Baptist	–	Also known as Pick Hill Chapel, this small, isolated building was opened in 1873 to replace an earlier chapel founded in about 1849 by Eli Page. It has been aligned with the Gospel Standard Baptist movement since 1864. The Vernacular-style structure has an entrance porch. It was registered for the solemnisation of marriages in August 1949.	
St John's Church (More images)		Polegate; 50.8196°N 0.2437°E	Anglican	–	Polegate's parish church was designed by R.K. Blessley and built in 1874–76. The Early English Gothic Revival-style building has a stone exterior but red brickwork inside, and a substantial timber roof. A tower topped by a broach spire sits at the northwest corner, and there is a transept on the north side. The lancet windows have tracery.	
St George's Church (More images)		Polegate; 50.8188°N 0.2427°E	Roman Catholic	–	The architect ("Mr Hughes") of this prominently sited church, built in 1938 and registered two years later, is unknown; attribution to J. O'Hanlon Hughes is based on his work at nearby Seaford three years earlier. The gable-roofed flint and stone Gothic Revival church has a porch jutting beyond the west end of the nave.	
Cornerstone Seventh-day Adventist Church (More images)		Polegate; 50.8243°N 0.2425°E	Seventh-day Adventist	–	In 2000, this congregation moved into a former school on the Hailsham Road and established a church there. The building, originally a National School, dates from 1850; after its closure in 1967, it was used by the Mencap charity until 1991.	
Polegate Free Church (More images)		Polegate; 50.8230°N 0.2441°E	United Reformed Church	–	This United Reformed church building was built for Congregationalists in 1904 and was registered for marriages two years later. It stands on Polegate High Street and has stone-dressed red brickwork and lancet windows.	
Heathfield Chapel (More images)		Punnett's Town; 50.9624°N 0.2974°E	Evangelical	II	George Gilbert, the "Sussex Apostle" and a former soldier under General George Eliott, founded a chapel at a remote crossroads (later called Chapel Cross) in 1787. His revered preaching attracted so many people that the present larger chapel was built 22 years later. It was registered for marriages in October 1847.	
St John the Baptist's Church (More images)		Ripe; 50.8685°N 0.1500°E	Anglican	I	The huge castellated tower at the west end—a 15th-century addition—dominates this church, which has a 13th-century nave and a slightly later chancel. It is associated with the Pelham baronets, whose buckle motif appears above the doorway. Medieval stained glass and a font dating from about 1400 also survive.	
St Denys' Church (More images)		Rotherfield; 51.0460°N 0.2184°E	Anglican	I	Berhtwald, a Saxon duke and Archbishop of Canterbury, travelled to France to visit the shrine of St Denys. He overcame the illness he sought to cure, and in 792 a church was founded in the saint's honour at Rotherfield. The present building has work from the 11th to the 15th centuries. Stained glass by Morris and Burne-Jones is considered exceptional.	
Providence Chapel (More images)		Rotherfield; 51.0451°N 0.2192°E	Strict Baptist	–	Baptist worship began in Rotherfield in 1823, but the congregation split in the 1850s and seceders founded Providence Chapel in 1858. After early difficulties, the cause prospered (whereas the original "Bethel Chapel" folded in the 1870s), and it has been part of the Gospel Standard movement since the 1890s. The red-brick, stone-quoined chapel has arched windows. It was registered for the solemnisation of marriages in February 1867.	
St Mary's Church (More images)		Selmeston; 50.8425°N 0.1431°E	Anglican	II	Ewan Christian rebuilt this flint church in 1867; its present appearance is similar to how it looked when originally built in the medieval era. Surviving elements from the old church include a blocked doorway, piscina and Easter sepulchre. The churchyard may have been the site of pre-Christian worship. A 17th-century vicar is commemorated on a brass memorial as "Henry Rogers—a painefull Preacher in this church two & thirty yeeres" [sic].	
St John the Evangelist's Church (More images)		St Johns, Crowborough; 51.0657°N 0.1448°E	Anglican	–	Built as a chapel of ease to Withyham in 1839, W.L. Blaker's ashlar building was extended in 1870 by the addition of a chancel with an apse at the east end. Charles Eamer Kempe designed the stained glass in the lancet windows. Originally known as Crowborough Chapel and now within the Crowborough urban area, the church gave its name to the part of that town it is in.	
Forest Fold Strict Baptist Chapel (More images)		St Johns, Crowborough; 51.0715°N 0.1533°E	Strict Baptist	–	A dream inspired a local farmer to found this chapel in a barn in 1832, and its success prompted extensions, stables and a Sunday school to be built soon afterwards. It was registered for marriages in May 1872. Two daughter chapels (both now closed) were also founded elsewhere in the town. The chapel has also been known as Two Chimneys. Ebenezer Littleton, pastor for 52 years, was an important figure in Crowborough life.	
St Luke's Church (More images)		Stone Cross; 50.8173°N 0.2920°E	Anglican	–	Alfred Hodgeman's 1924 church, a chapel of ease to Westham, closed in 1978 but opened again ten years later after extensive house-building boosted the potential congregation. It was parished in 1995. The vernacular brick and tile-hung building has a hammerbeam roof and a prominent tower.	
The Rest Christian Centre (More images)		Three Cups Corner; 50.9574°N 0.3263°E	Baptist	–	Mount Hermon Baptist Chapel was founded in 1865. Seceders from it founded a chapel nearby at Three Cups Corner in 1872. It hosted Independent Baptist worshippers and later Brethren (for whom it was registered in May 1949); then following the closure and sale of the Mount Hermon chapel, its congregation acquired the building and moved in.	
St John the Baptist's Church (More images)		Tidebrook; 51.0468°N 0.3014°E	Anglican	II	Thomas Rushforth's 1856 church in this isolated hamlet occupies a steeply sloping site, so it has a tall west end and an undercroft. The stone-built Early English-style building has a belfry on the chancel roof, which has substantial arch braces inside.	
Holy Cross Church (More images)		Uckfield; 50.9734°N 0.0949°E	Anglican	II	Little survives of the market town's ancient church of this dedication; William Moseley rebuilt it in 1839, retaining the dimensions of the old chancel and tower, and an extension was built in 1889. Memorials and interior fittings from the original building have been reset in the new building.	
St Saviour's Church (More images)		Uckfield; 50.9666°N 0.1020°E	Anglican	–	The New Town area of Uckfield grew rapidly in the Victorian era, and in 1904 a chapel of ease was built to serve its residents. The corrugated iron structure, which had a small steeple, was removed in 1971 to make way for a building consisting of sheltered housing for 20 people and a small chapel for public worship.	
Foresters Strict Baptist Chapel (More images)		Uckfield; 50.9657°N 0.0999°E	Strict Baptist	–	The 1789 Baptist church in Uckfield, originally Strict Baptist, had a General Baptist pastor by the early 20th century. Strict Baptist members of the congregation seceded in 1920 and founded a new chapel next to Foresters Hall in the south of the town. The Gospel Standard movement is followed. The building was formally registered for worship in May 1961.	
Grange Evangelical Church (More images)		Uckfield; 50.9727°N 0.0984°E	Open Brethren	–	This Open Brethren assembly has its origins in the 1890s, when worship took place in Uckfield Assembly Rooms. In September 1902, the present building (originally named Grange Hall) was opened with help (and finance) from Lady Portman, who arranged for notable London preachers to visit. The church was registered with the name Grange Hall in February 1903.	
King's Centre		Uckfield; 50.9710°N 0.0971°E	Evangelical	–	Meetings of this Evangelical congregation take place at this building (also the church's main office) and at Uckfield's Civic Centre. The church belongs to the Evangelical Alliance and the Newfrontiers movement, and was founded in 1983.	
Foresters Hall (More images)		Uckfield; 50.9658°N 0.1000°E	Muslim	–	The local Muslim community use this hall, built in 1904, for worship and other activities. It stands next to the Foresters Strict Baptist Chapel and is also used by community groups.	
Church of Our Lady Immaculate & St Philip Neri (More images)		Uckfield; 50.9647°N 0.0966°E	Roman Catholic	–	Rev. Cyril Plummer, Uckfield's Roman Catholic parish priest, designed the town's "unusual" concrete-framed Cotswold stone church himself. Joseph Cribb made the altars and a statue of Mary; Aleksander Klecki's stained glass is abstract in style. The church, registered in June 1946 and completed in 1958, replaced Frederick Walters' 1885 predecessor.	
Cornerstone Church (More images)		Uckfield; 50.9677°N 0.0968°E	United Reformed Church/Methodist	–	This Early English-style church on the main road to Eastbourne was built in 1885–86 for the Congregational community, although it retains the formal registration of a predecessor chapel dating from 1867. It founded daughter churches (now closed) at Fletching, Framfield and Isfield, and became part of the United Reformed Church in 1972. The town's Methodist congregation vacated their church and joined in May 2017, and the name was changed to reflect this. Locally quarried stone is the main structural material.	
Holy Trinity Church (More images)		Upper Dicker; 50.8670°N 0.2032°E	Anglican	–	Arlington church served villagers in Upper Dicker until William Donthorne's Neo-Norman local flint and Caen stone chapel was completed in 1843. A parish was carved out of Arlington, Chiddingly and Hellingly's territory. The simple church has a nave, chancel and bellcote, and a font dated 1663.	
St Peter and St Paul's Church (More images)		Wadhurst; 51.0627°N 0.3401°E	Anglican	I	This large church is mostly unchanged since the 15th century, when a porch was added to the Norman tower (with a shingled broach spire, aisled nave of the 13th century and the 14th-century chancel. Cast-iron memorial slabs line the church floor, and the font is 13th-century.	
Church of the Sacred Heart (More images)		Wadhurst; 51.0650°N 0.3244°E	Roman Catholic	–	Rosminian monks from Italy owned a large house in Wadhurst, which became the site of The Mount Novitiate House of Fathers of Charity. It had its own chapel, but in 1928 the monks founded a new church for public worship. It was built in a "curious" Italianate style by E. Bower Norris, and opened in March 1929 and was registered for marriages just over a year later. The nave windows project above the low roofline, forming gabled dormers.	
All Saints Church (More images)		Waldron; 50.9517°N 0.2039°E	Anglican	I	R.C. Hussey's restoration work in 1859–62 added a south aisle to the nave, but otherwise the original 13th-century Early English Gothic appearance remains. The lancet windows are more Decorated Gothic in style.	
St Mary the Virgin Church (More images)		Warbleton; 50.9408°N 0.2886°E	Anglican	II	The church stands on high ground in an ancient churchyard which has a memorial to Richard Woodman, one of the Sussex Martyrs of 1557, who lived locally. All three English Gothic styles are featured: Early English in the chancel, Decorated in the north aisle, and a Perpendicular tower, east window and arcade. An impressive 4.4-foot (1.3 m) memorial brass of William Prestwyck of Hastings dates from 1436.	
St Mary Magdalene's Church (More images)		Wartling; 50.8582°N 0.3541°E	Anglican	I	The present building probably stands on the site of a pre-Domesday chapel. Fragments of 13th-century walls remain, but most of the structure is from the following 200 years. Porches were added in 1736 and the late 19th century. The weatherboarded belfry may be 14th-century. Inside there is a "stunning and unique" modern lectern in the shape of a heron.	
All Saints Church (More images)		Westdean; 50.7768°N 0.1618°E	Anglican	I	The "monk's hood"-style broach spire on the two-stage tower is seen only in Sussex. A Saxon window remains, and the lower part of the tower is Norman. The chancel is 14th-century; a major restoration took place at that time. An ancient priest's house is built into the churchyard wall. Many old monuments have been preserved inside.	
St Mary's Church (More images)		Westham; 50.8176°N 0.3291°E	Anglican	I	Often called the first post-Norman Conquest church built in England, this substantial stone building has been damaged by invaders on many occasions, despite its proximity to Pevensey Castle. The cruciform building has a Perpendicular Gothic Revival tower. The churchyard has a communal grave for plague victims.	
St Mary the Virgin Church (More images)		Willingdon; 50.7998°N 0.2541°E	Anglican	I	Willingdon's church is Early English in style and has an almost completely detached corner tower—the only surviving part of the original (13th-century) church. The present appearance is mostly 14th-century, but the interior was restored after World War II after bomb damage.	
St Mary and St Peter's Church (More images)		Wilmington; 50.8175°N 0.1906°E	Anglican	I	A Norman abbey existed here, and when the church was built it shared a cloister with that building. The church was restored by Paley and Austin in 1883, but its ancient appearance has been preserved. The yew in the churchyard is 1,600 years old.	
St Michael and All Angels Church (More images)		Withyham; 51.0999°N 0.1323°E	Anglican	I	Few Sussex churches date from the 17th century, but Withyham's was completely rebuilt then after a lightning strike in 1663 destroyed the 14th-century structure. Some original material was reused. George Sackville-West, 5th Earl De La Warr was the rector in the mid-19th century, and he painted the Last Judgment mural. The Sackvilles have their own substantial chapel on the north side.	

== See also ==
- Media related to Places of worship in Wealden at Wikimedia Commons
- List of demolished places of worship in East Sussex
- List of former places of worship in Wealden

== Bibliography ==
- Alexander, Rosemary (1996). A Short History of Buxted (1st ed.). Tunbridge Wells: Opax Ltd.
- Chambers, Ralph F. (1954). The Strict Baptist Chapels of England – Volume II: Sussex. Thornton Heath: Ralph F. Chambers.
- Coppin, Paul (2001). 101 Medieval Churches of East Sussex. Seaford: S.B. Publications. ISBN 1-85770-238-7.
- Elleray, D. Robert (1981). The Victorian Churches of Sussex. Chichester: Phillimore & Co. Ltd. ISBN 0-85033-378-4.
- Elleray, D. Robert (2004). Sussex Places of Worship. Worthing: Optimus Books. ISBN 0-9533132-7-1.
- Fisher, E. A. (1970). The Saxon Churches of Sussex. Newton Abbot: David & Charles. ISBN 0-7153-4946-5.
- Foord, Frances (1980). Cross-in-Hand. Frances Foord.
- Foord, Keith (2017). Methodism in Eastern Sussex 1756–2017 (PDF). Battle and District Historical Society Collectanea: Topic F (Religion, General, Conformist, Non-Conformist and Roman Catholic), Item 3.2. Battle: Battle and District Historical Society. Archived (PDF) from the original on 21 November 2020.
- Gillet, Alan; Russell, Barry K. (1991). Around Heathfield in Old Photographs: a Second Selection. Stroud: Alan Sutton Publishing Ltd. ISBN 0-86299-950-2.
- Hill, Roy (2002) [1990]. The Assemblies Address Book (PDF) (5th ed.). Bristol: Christian Year Publications. ISBN 1-872734-25-1. Archived from the original (PDF) on 19 September 2004.
- Homan, Roger (1997). "Mission and Fission: the organization of Huntingtonian and Calvinistic Baptist causes in Sussex in the 18th and 19th centuries". Sussex Archaeological Collections. 135. Lewes: Sussex Archaeological Society. doi:10.5284/1085045. ISSN 0143-8204.
- Howard, Eve, ed. (1992). Mayfield: a Short Historic Guide (Illustrated) (3rd ed.). Mayfield: Mayfield Local History Society.
- Longstaff-Tyrrell, Peter (2004). A Portrait of Polegate (1st ed.). Polegate: GoteHouse Publishing. ISBN 0-9521297-9-5.
- Methodist Church of Great Britain (1947). Methodist Church Buildings: Statistical Returns including Seating Accommodation as at July 1st, 1940 (PDF). Manchester: The Department for Chapel Affairs. (Available online in 14 parts; Guide to abbreviations on page 6)
- Nairn, Ian; Nikolaus Pevsner (1965). The Buildings of England: Sussex. Harmondsworth: Penguin Books. ISBN 0-14-071028-0.
- Payne, Malcolm (1985). Crowborough: the Growth of a Wealden Town. Studley: K.A.F. Brewin Books. ISBN 0-947731-04-0.
- Payne, Malcolm; Batchelor, Luther (1987). Bygone Crowborough. Chichester: Phillimore & Co. Ltd. ISBN 0-85033-647-3.
- Salter, Mike (2000). The Old Parish Churches of Sussex. Malvern: Folly Publications. ISBN 1-871731-40-2.
- Savidge, Alan; Mason, Oliver (1988). Wadhurst: Town of the High Weald. Rainham: Meresborough Books. ISBN 978-0-948-19335-4.
- Smith, Lez (2003). A History of the Dicker: Two Sussex Villages. Hailsham: Lez Smith. ISBN 0-9546322-0-6.
- Stell, Christopher (2002). Nonconformist Chapels and Meeting-houses in Eastern England. Swindon: English Heritage. ISBN 1-873592-50-7.
- Swinfen, Warden; Arscott, David (1984). Hidden Sussex. Brighton: BBC Radio Sussex. ISBN 0-9509510-0-5.
- Syms, James Antony (1994). East Sussex Country Churches. Seaford: S.B. Publications. ISBN 1-85770-056-2.
- Taylor, Rupert (1999). The East Sussex Village Book. Newbury: Countryside Books. ISBN 1-85306-580-3.
- The Diocese of Arundel & Brighton (2019). Diocese of Arundel & Brighton Catholic Directory 2019. Purley: Roman Catholic Diocese of Arundel and Brighton.
- The Diocese of Arundel & Brighton (2020). Diocese of Arundel & Brighton Catholic Directory 2020. Purley: Roman Catholic Diocese of Arundel and Brighton.
- Thomson, J. Radford (1883). Pelton's Illustrated Guide to Tunbridge Wells and the Neighbouring Seats, Towns and Villages (10th ed.). Tunbridge Wells: Richard Pelton.
- Thorogood, Derek (1994). Uckfield Congregational Church: An Account of the Years 1866–1972. Framfield: Derek Thorogood. ISBN 0-9524531-0-X.
- Various authors (1978). 175 Years of Methodism in Eastbourne 1803–1978. Eastbourne: Eastbourne Methodist Circuit.
- Whatmore, Leonard E. (1972). A History of St Wilfrid's Parish, Hailsham. Hailsham: St Wilfrid's Church, Hailsham.
- Whatmore, Leonard E. (1977). The Story of Our Lady of Ransom Eastbourne. Eastbourne: Our Lady of Ransom Church.
- Wilkins, Amanda (2000). Pevensey & Wallsend: a History of Pevensey and Pevensey Bay. Lewes: The Book Guild Ltd. ISBN 1-85776-560-5.
- Wright, Simon; Harker, Michael (1993). Uckfield in Transition: a Photographic Record 1968–1993. Uckfield: Uckfield and District Preservation Society. ISBN 0-9518505-1-2.
- s.n. (1933). The Story of Crowborough. Tunbridge Wells: Courier Co. Ltd.
