= St Andrew's Church, Alfriston =

St Andrew's Church
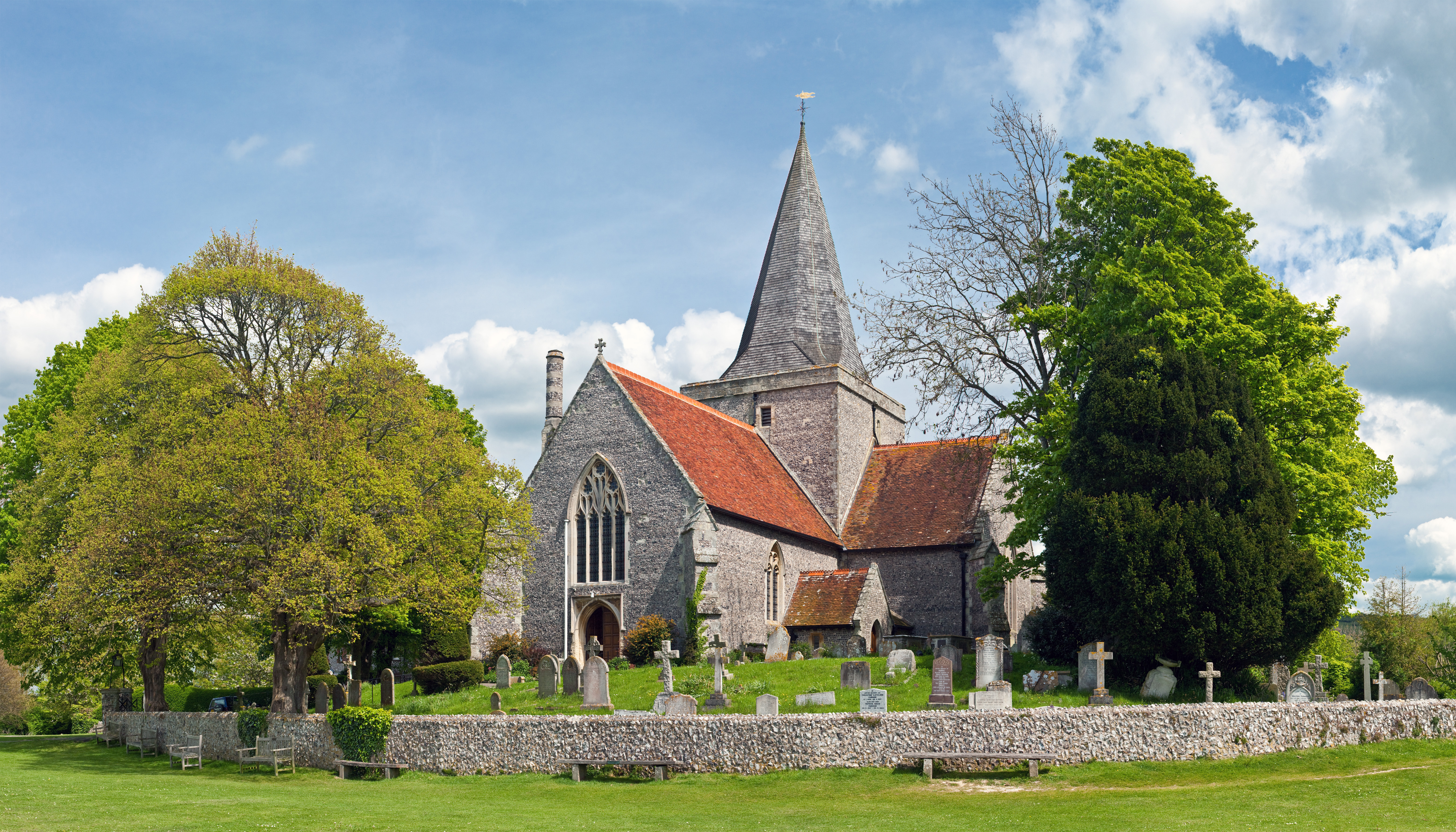
- The church in 2009
- St Andrew's Church
- 50°48′23″N 0°9′28″E
- Location: Alfriston, East Sussex
- Country: England
- Denomination: Church of England
- Previous denomination: Roman Catholic

History
- Status: Active
- Founded: 1366
- Dedication: St Andrew

Architecture
- Style: Greek Cross

Specifications
- Length: 115 feet (35 m)

Listed Building – Grade I
- Official name: Parish Church of St Andrew
- Designated: 30 August 1966
- Reference no.: 1043353

St Andrew's Church is the parish church of Alfriston, East Sussex, England. This Grade I listed building was built in the 1370s and is also known as the 'Cathedral of the Downs'. It sits on a small, flint-walled mound, indicating that it was the site of a pre-Christian place of worship, in the middle of 'the Tye' (the local village green), overlooking the River Cuckmere, and is surrounded by the flowered graveyard. It is built in the form of a Greek cross.

== Features ==
No records or monuments indicate who commissioned the church's construction. A consistent architectural style throughout indicates that it was built all at once. Typically, completing such a building before tastes and building techniques have changed is possible only when an individual or family has sponsored the construction, and that person would be buried in the church's graveyard or entombed within. However, St Andrew's does not have any grand tomb or memorial, nor any records indicating who a patron might be. Additionally, there was no Lord of the manor for Alfriston at the time.

However, on the left-hand side of the south porch there is a Canonical sundial, dating from the 14th century. The stone with the carved sundial was originally on the south wall and was moved to its present location when the porch was built. Near to the altar are carvings , one of which has been identified as representing Saint Lewinna, the other a beaver biting off its own testicles.

The church's architectural style has been described as an obvious example of the transition from Decorated to Perpendicular. It has a ring of six bells in the central tower and is unusual in that the bells are rung from the floor of the chancel. The oldest bell dates to about 1400, two date from 1698 and one from 1811. The later three were recast in 1928 when a 6th bell was added. The remaining bell dates to 1819 and was recast in 1955.

Every year the church hosts a model Christmas Nativity on the altar.

Next to it is the Alfriston Clergy House, owned by the National Trust (NT).

== Exterior ==
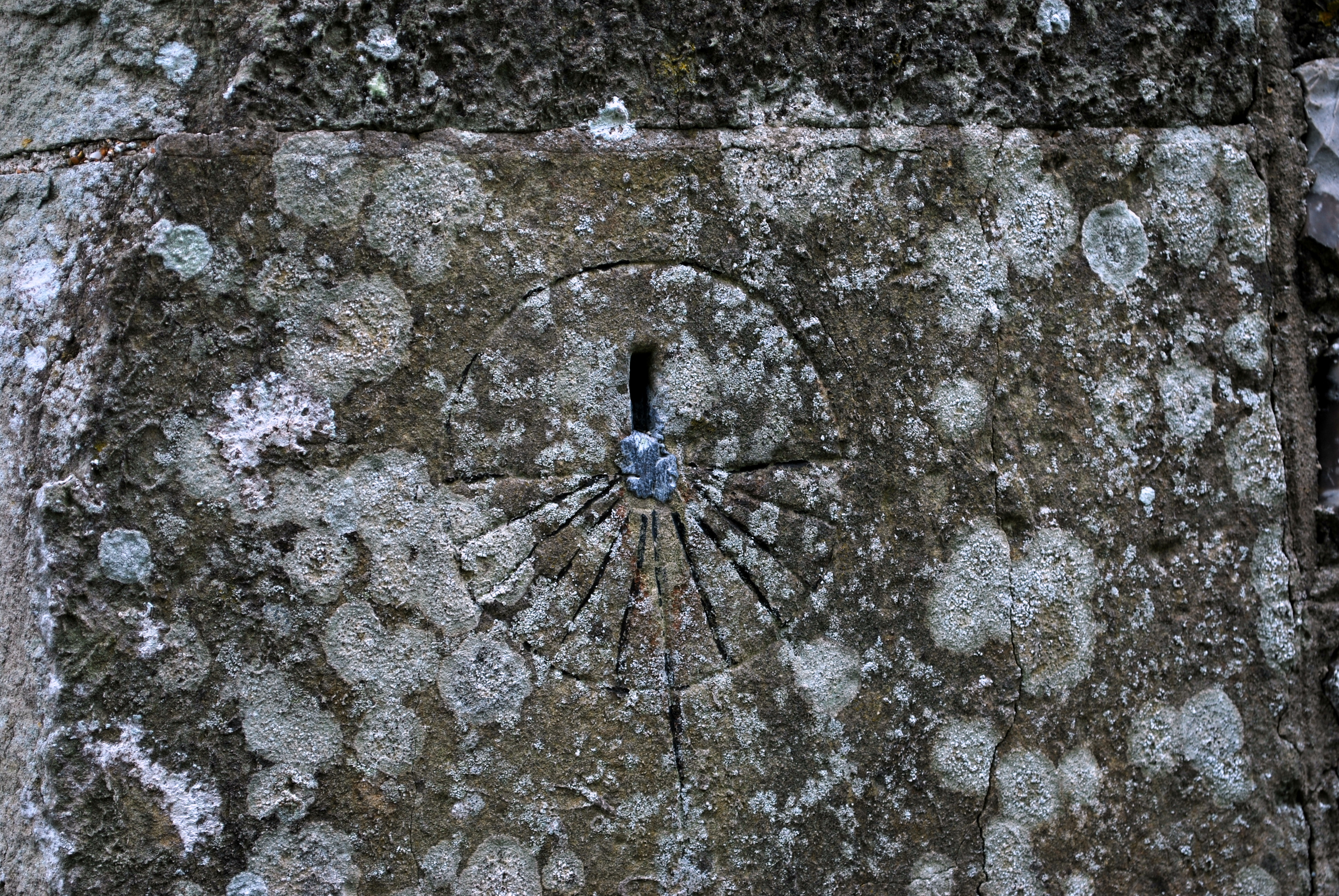
Canonical sundial

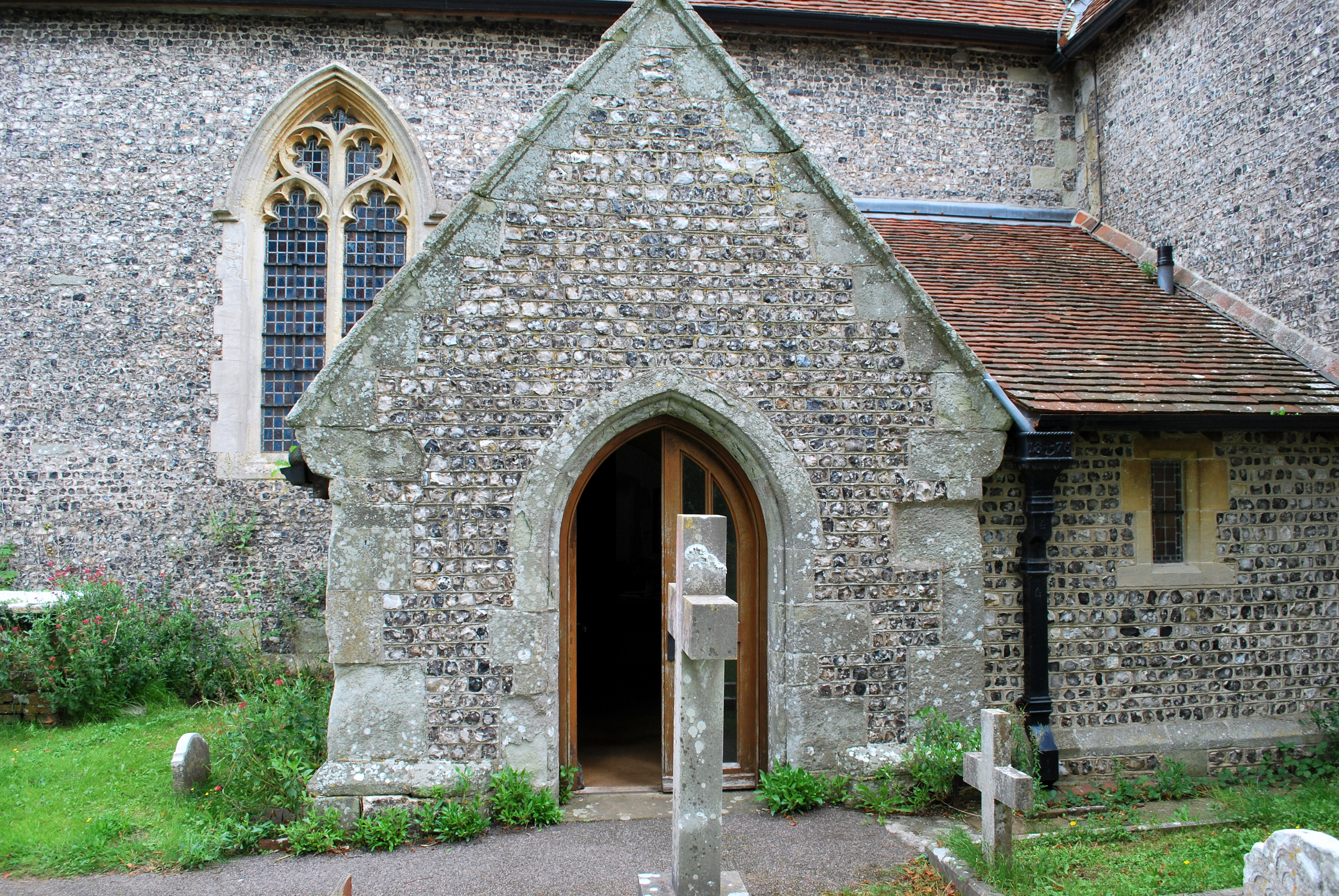
Position of the sundial

== See also ==
- List of current places of worship in Wealden
