= Herstmonceux Free Church =

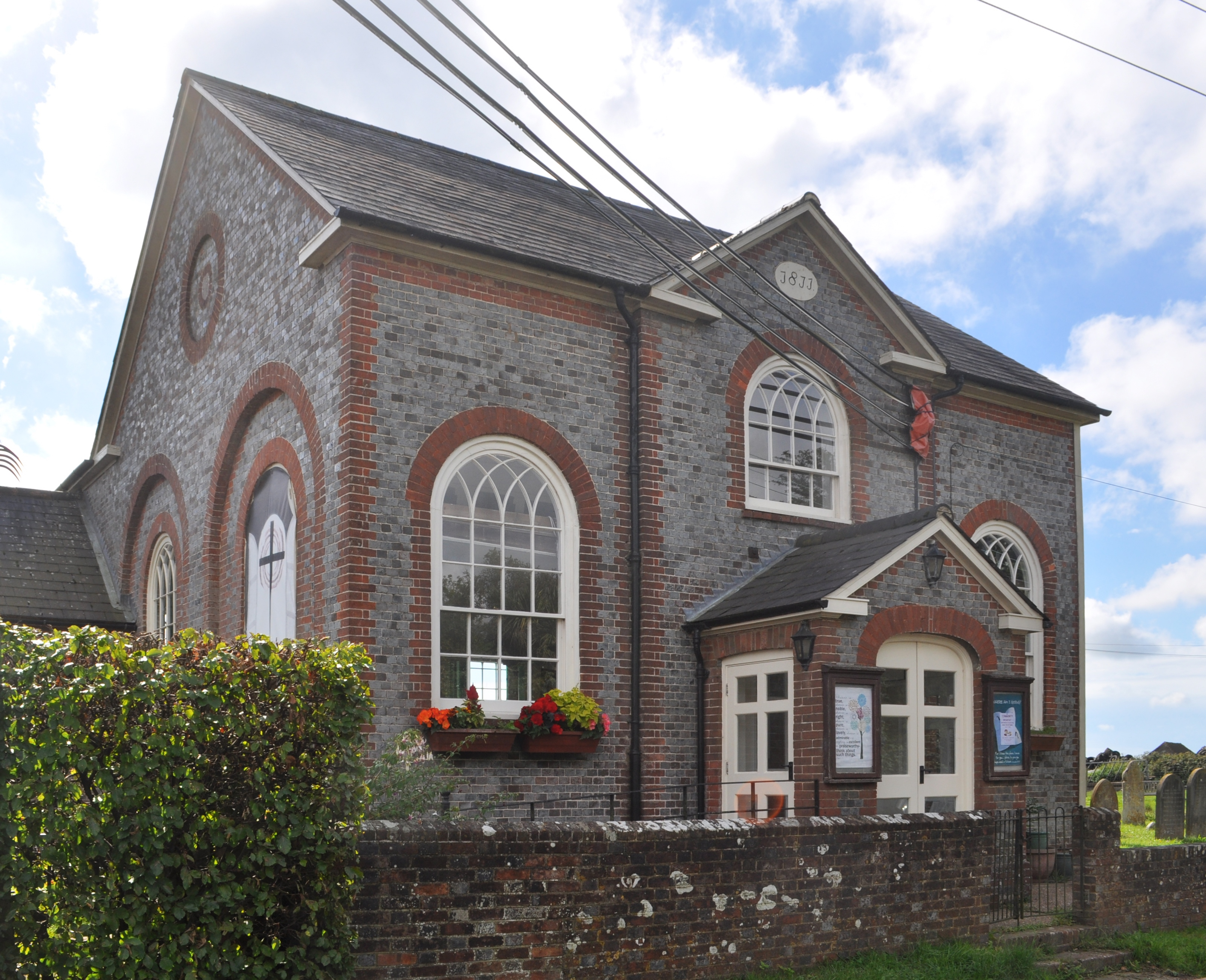
- The chapel in September 2023
- Herstmonceux Free Church
- 50°53′8.0″N 0°19′40.1″E
- Location: Herstmonceux, East Sussex
- Country: England
- Denomination: Congregational Federation
- Website: www.herstmonceuxfreechurch.org.uk

History
- Founded: 1811

Architecture
- Functional status: Active
- Heritage designation: Grade II
- Designated: 1966

Herstmonceux Free Church is a congregational chapel located in Herstmonceux, East Sussex. It was initially constructed at its site on Chapel Row in 1811. The church is a member of the Congregational Federation and has an active membership of around 40 people. The building is grade II listed by English Heritage as a building of special architectural or historical interest.

== See also ==
- List of current places of worship in Wealden
