= St Catherine's Church, Littlehampton =

St Catherine's Church
- St Catherine of Alexandria Church
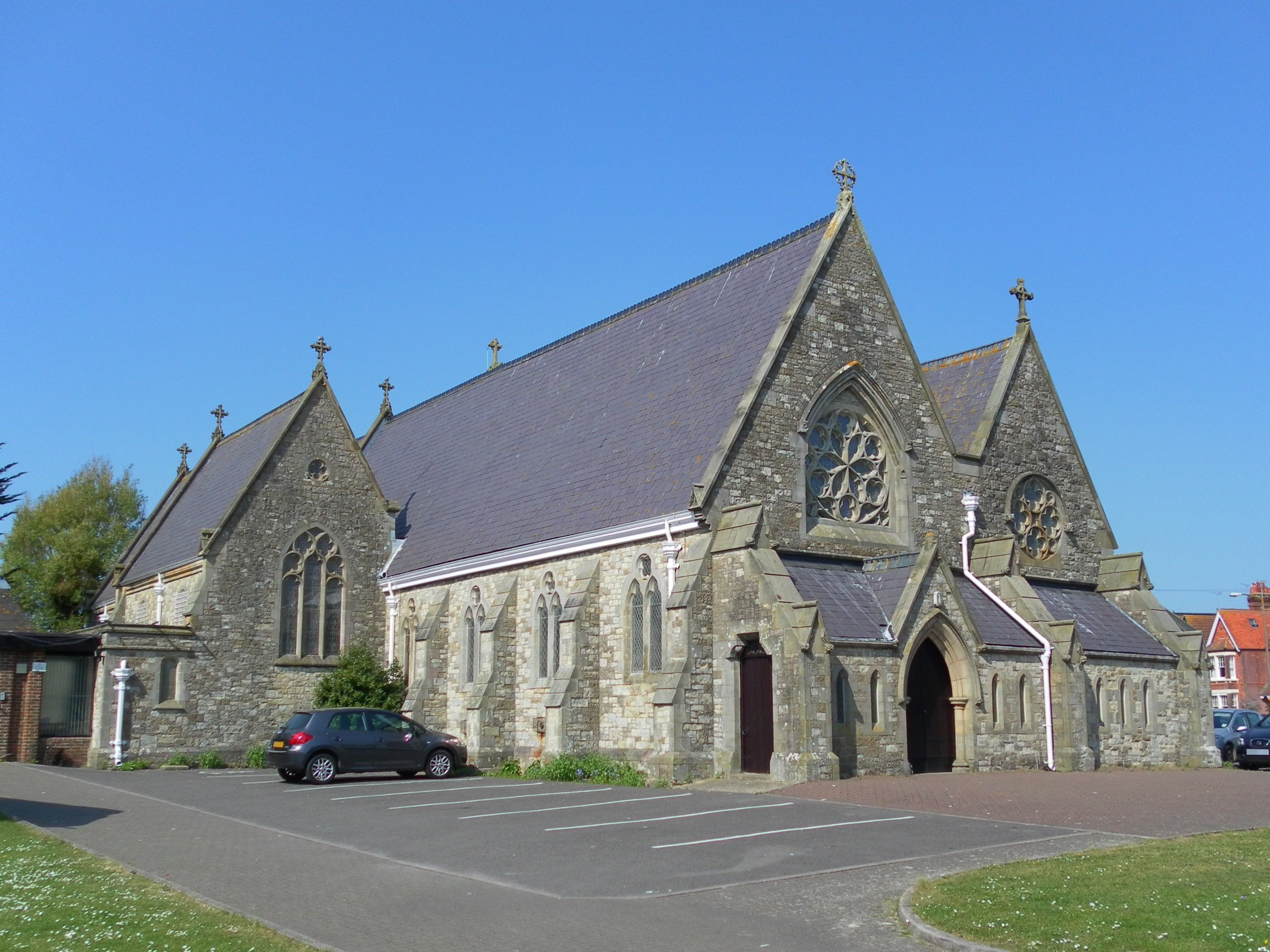
- St Catherine's Church
- 50.8060°N 0.5396°W
- Location: Littlehampton, West Sussex
- Country: England
- Denomination: Roman Catholic
- Website: StCatherinesChurchLittlehampton.org

History
- Status: Active
- Founded: 1862
- Founder: Augusta Fitzalan-Howard, Duchess of Norfolk
- Dedication: Catherine of Alexandria

Architecture
- Functional status: Parish church
- Heritage designation: Grade II listed
- Designated: 21 August 1975
- Architect: Matthew Ellison Hadfield
- Style: Gothic Revival
- Groundbreaking: 1862
- Completed: 1904

Administration
- Province: Southwark
- Diocese: Arundel and Brighton
- Deanery: Worthing

St Catherine's Church is a Roman Catholic Parish church in Littlehampton, West Sussex, England. It was founded in 1862, built in stages afterwards and designed by Matthew Ellison Hadfield. It is situated on Beach Road backing on to St Catherine's Road in the centre of the town. It is a Gothic Revival church and a Grade II listed building.

== History ==
=== Foundation ===
In 1862, Augusta Fitzalan-Howard, Duchess of Norfolk, paid for a church to be built in Littlehampton. She was also behind the building of St John the Evangelist Church in Heron's Ghyll. She paid Matthew Ellison Hadfield to design a set of buildings in Littlehampton comprising a church, presbytery and school. However, the plans were changed and in the end, a presbytery and church were built. The church simply consisted of a nave and sanctuary.

=== Construction ===
From 1883 to 1884, further construction was done on the church. Again, this was designed by Hadfield. A further aisle was added expanding the capacity of the church and a gallery was built.

=== Extension ===
In 1904, the church was extended. The architectural firm was Pugin & Pugin. The building was expanded eastwards by the enlarging of the sanctuary. A chapel, St Joseph's Chapel, was added to the north side of the church and a separate entrance for it was made. In addition, two confessionals were built as well as a new altar and pulpit. The altar was made by Messrs R. L. Boulton & Sons from Cheltenham and cost £340. The stained glass windows that were installed were made by Cox & Barnard from Hove.

== Parish ==
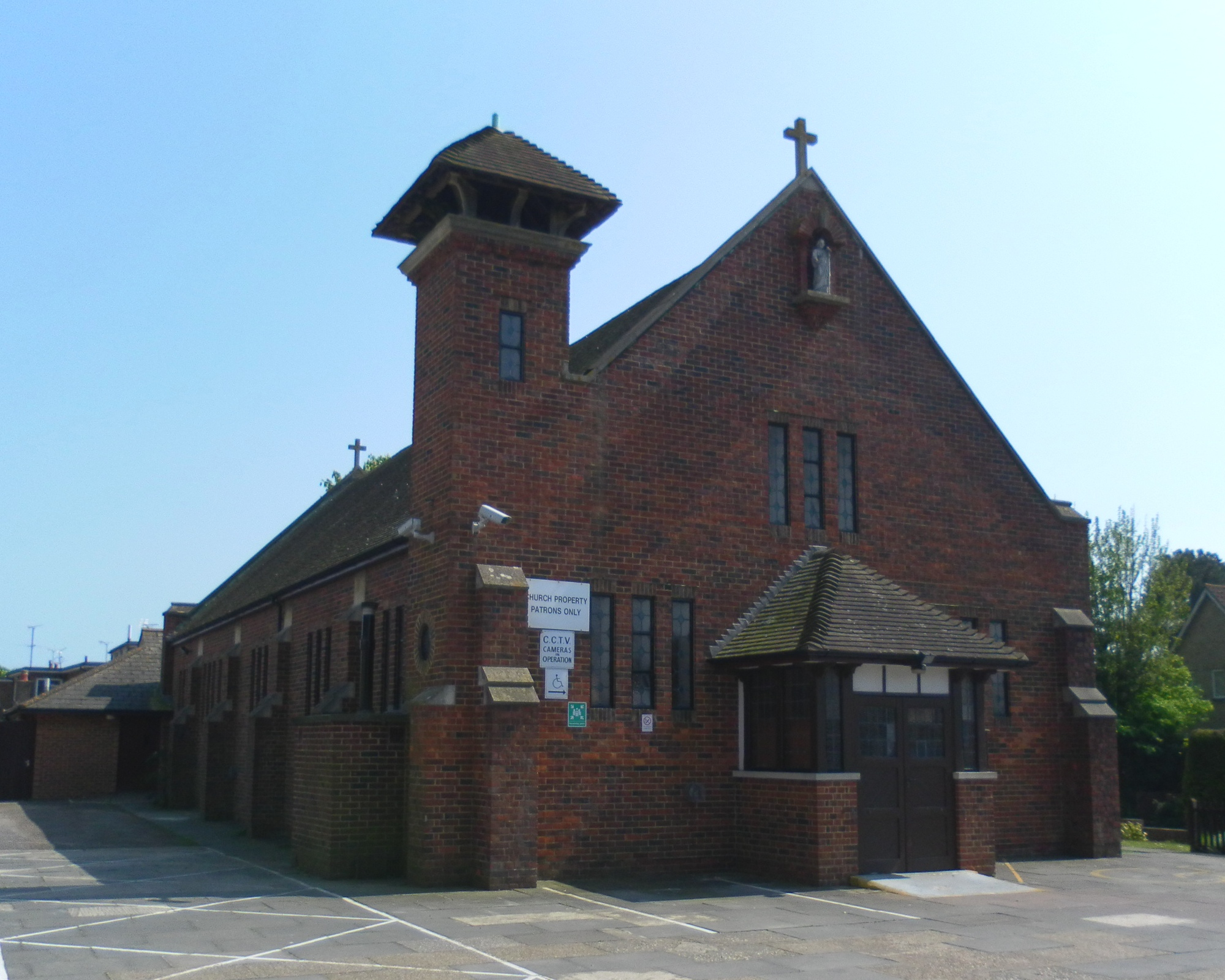
St Joseph's Church in Rustington

Within St Catherine's parish is St Joseph's Church in Rustington. It was built from 1949 to 1950 and designed by John D. Hicks.

St Catherine's Church has three Sunday Masses at 6:30pm on Saturday and at 9:00am (in Portuguese) and 11:00am on Sunday. St Joseph's Church has one Sunday Mass at 9:00am.

== See also ==
- List of places of worship in Arun
- Roman Catholic Diocese of Arundel and Brighton
