= Crowborough Community Church =

- The Oasis
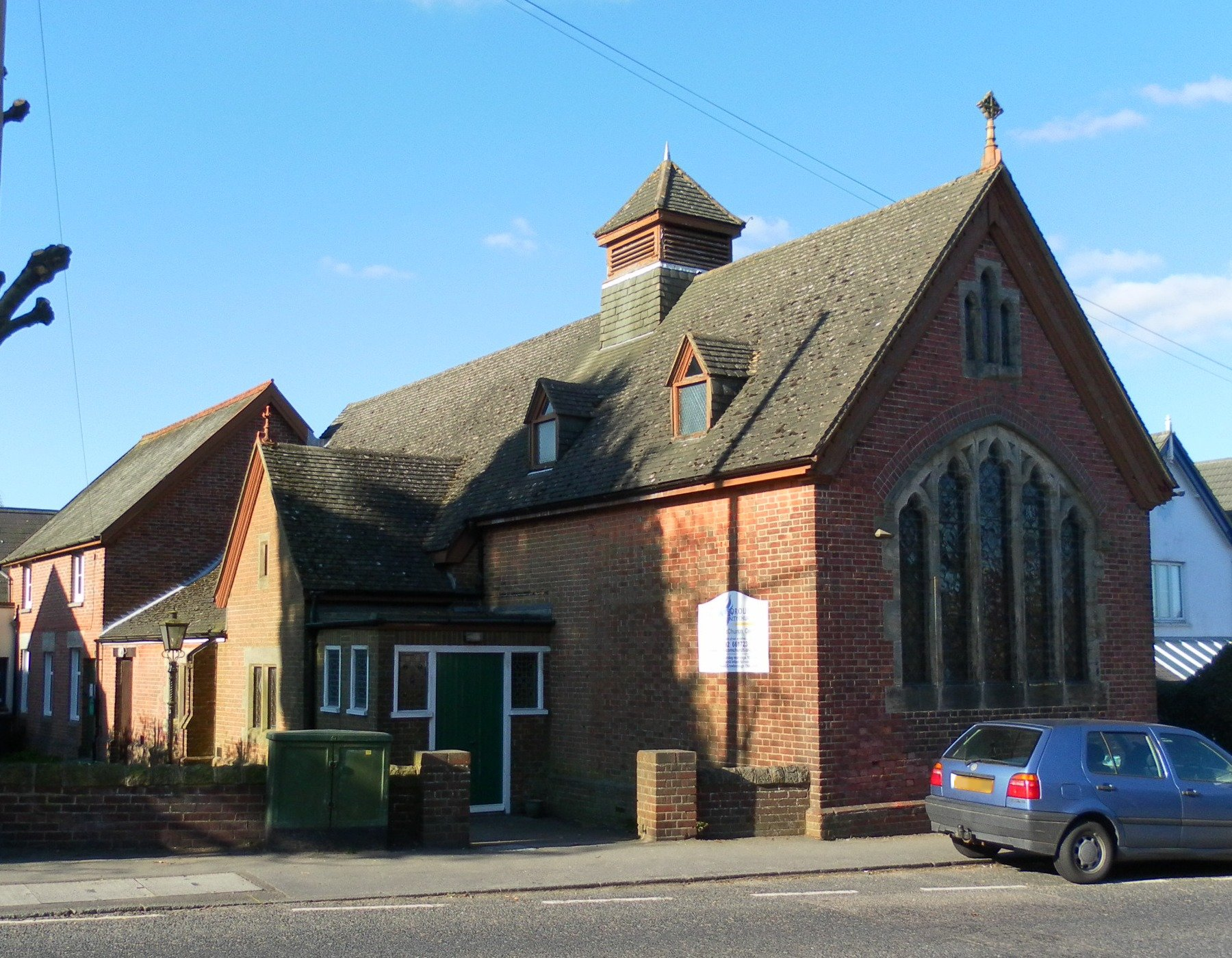
- The church from the southwest

- 51°03′38″N 0°09′38″E
- Location: Beacon Road, Crowborough, East Sussex TN6 1AS
- Country: England
- Denomination: Evangelical
- Previous denomination: Free Church of England
- Tradition: Newfrontiers
- Website: www.crowcomchurch.org.uk/welcome.htm

History
- Former name: Christ Church
- Status: Church
- Founded: 1879
- Founder: Elizabeth de Lannoy

Architecture
- Functional status: Active

Clergy
- Pastor(s): Jonathan Hayward (lead); Ian Watt

Crowborough Community Church (also known as Community Church, Crowborough) is an Evangelical church in the town of Crowborough in East Sussex, England. Although it is now associated with the Newfrontiers charismatic Evangelical movement, for most of its existence it was called Christ Church and belonged to the Free Church of England, an episcopal Protestant denomination founded in the 19th century. The building, a red-brick Gothic Revival chapel with a prominent stained glass window facing the street, has stood in a central position in the town since 1879, when it was built at the expense of philanthropist Elizabeth de Lannoy. The complex includes schoolrooms and a lecture hall, part of which served as Crowborough's public library for many years.

== History ==
Until the last quarter of the 19th century, Crowborough consisted of "a scatter of settlements" at the highest part of the Weald. New railway links and the release of land from large country estates for residential development stimulated rapid development: by 1910 many of the town's present buildings had been completed, including most of its churches, and the populated tripled in the ten years from 1900. The Church of England became established in the town in 1744, ten years Sir Henry Fermor bequeathed £1,500 "for the erection of a chapel and school", and Baptists had met for worship in the area since the 17th century.

The next place of worship to be built in the town was also built at the sole expanse of a local benefactor. In 1879, Elizabeth de Lannoy paid for the construction of a chapel called Christ Church on Beacon Road and donated it to the Free Church of England denomination. Five years later she endowed the living of the church for £2,000 (equivalent to £167,718 in 2019). The church's first minister, who served from 1879 until his death on 14 November 1900, was Bishop Samuel James Dicksee. On 6 November 1889 he became the Bishop Primus of the Free Church of England, the leader of the denomination, and also served in that role until his death. Elizabeth de Lannoy also paid for the construction of a rectory for Bishop Dicksee; he lived in the house, called Brincliffe, for most of his incumbency. After his death, his wife funded a new rectory as a memorial. The building stood on the Eridge Road and was called The Parsonage; it is no longer owned by the church and is in private ownership. She also paid for a schoolroom and separate lecture hall to be built behind the church. The lecture hall served as Crowborough's public library until the council built new premises elsewhere in the town in the late 1950s.

The building continued in use by the Free Church of England throughout the 20th century. It was stated in 1985 that "adult immersion baptism was practised" at the church. In 2004 it was described as an "independent Free Evangelical church", but by 2008 it had closed for worship. Meanwhile, a newly established Evangelical congregation called Crowborough Community Church, which at the time met for worship in a school, was growing. This had its origins in May 1997 when some worshippers from King's Church Uckfield, an Evangelical church in nearby Uckfield, began to meet in Crowborough. Members of the former Christ Church also joined the new Community Church, and by 2015 the congregation had acquired the former Christ Church premises and was using them for administrative purposes and for certain activities, although Sunday worship had moved to a community centre building. Church services resumed in the former Christ Church in 2018 following a period of renovation, and the building is now known as The Oasis.

== Architecture ==
Christ Church is a "very modest" chapel distinguished by its large, wide five-light west window facing the street. It is a Perpendicular Gothic Revival building of red brick with stone dressings. The side elevations have small gabled dormer windows. Stained glass designed Arthur Dix designed the glass in the north window in 1918. Memorials inside the church include a tablet commemorating Elizabeth de Lannoy and a "beautiful marble font" given by the widow of David Murray Somerville, the incumbent from 1906 until 1917.

== Administration ==
The church is registered for worship in accordance with the Places of Worship Registration Act 1855; its number on the register is 24801. Under its original name, Christ Church, it was registered for the solemnisation of marriages in accordance with the Marriage Act 1836 on 7 March 1881. It is a member of the Evangelical Alliance and the Newfrontiers movement.

== See also ==
- Media related to Christ Church, Crowborough at Wikimedia Commons
- List of current places of worship in Wealden

== Bibliography ==
- Antram, Nicholas; Pevsner, Nikolaus (2013). Sussex: East with Brighton and Hove. The Buildings of England. London: Yale University Press. ISBN 978-0-300-18473-0.
- Elleray, D. Robert (2004). Sussex Places of Worship. Worthing: Optimus Books. ISBN 0-9533132-7-1.
- Harris, Roland B. (2008). Crowborough Historic Character Assessment Report (PDF) (Report). East Sussex County Council, West Sussex County Council and Brighton and Hove City Council. Archived (PDF) from the original on 9 January 2021.
- Payne, Malcolm (1985). Crowborough: the Growth of a Wealden Town. Studley: K.A.F. Brewin Books. ISBN 0-947731-04-0.
- Payne, Malcolm; Batchelor, Luther (1987). Bygone Crowborough. Chichester: Phillimore & Co. Ltd. ISBN 0-85033-647-3.
- s.n. (1933). The Story of Crowborough. Tunbridge Wells: Courier Co. Ltd.
