= St John the Evangelist Church, Heron's Ghyll =

St John's Church
- St John the Evangelist Church
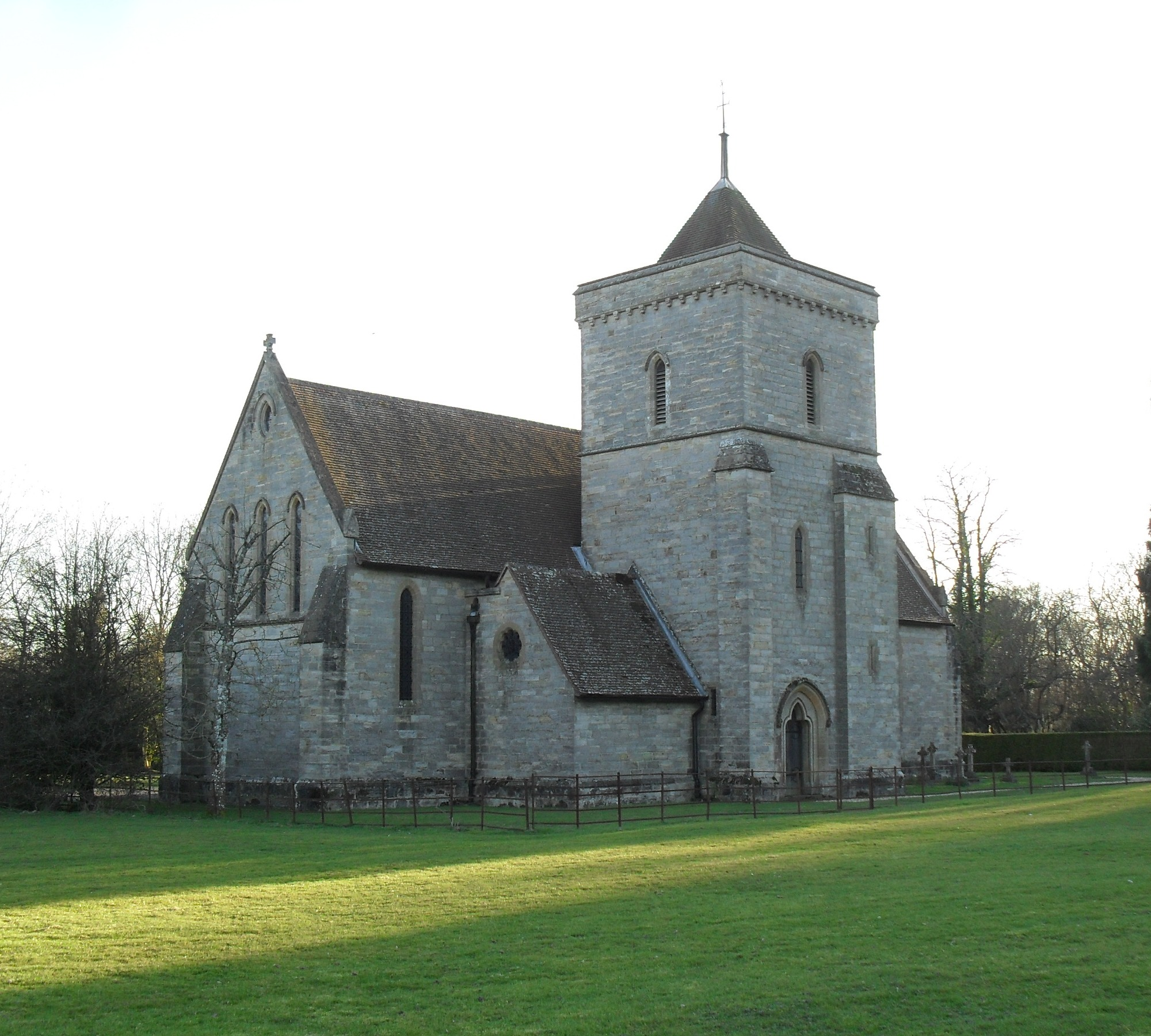
- St John's Church
- 51.0231°N 0.1115°E
- OS grid reference: TQ 48184 26977
- Location: Heron's Ghyll, East Sussex
- Country: England
- Denomination: Roman Catholic
- Website: Crowborough, Herons Ghyll & Uckfield Catholic Community

History
- Status: Active
- Founder: James Hope, 1st Baron Rankeillour
- Dedication: John the Evangelist

Architecture
- Functional status: Parish church
- Heritage designation: Grade II listed
- Designated: 31 December 1982
- Architect: Frederick Walters
- Style: Gothic Revival
- Groundbreaking: 9 May 1896
- Completed: 22 September 1897

Administration
- Province: Southwark
- Diocese: Arundel and Brighton
- Deanery: Mayfield
- Parish: Uckfield with Heron's Ghyll

St John's Church or St John the Evangelist Church is a Roman Catholic Parish Church in the Heron's Ghyll settlement of Buxted, East Sussex, England. It was built from 1896 to 1897 and designed by Frederick Walters. It is situated on the A26 road in the centre of Heron's Ghyll. It is a Gothic Revival church and is a Grade II listed building.

== History ==
=== Foundation ===
In 1866, the first Catholic mission in the area started in the house of the poet Coventry Patmore. He became a Catholic in 1862, after the death of his first wife, and allowed Mass to be said in his house a year after remarrying. In 1875, he moved to Hastings and founded St Mary Star of the Sea Church there. In 1879, Henry Fitzalan-Howard, 15th Duke of Norfolk bought the house. He purchased it for his widowed mother, Augusta Fitzalan-Howard, Duchess of Norfolk. In 1880, she was behind the building of a school where Mass could be said and a presbytery. These two buildings are currently to the southwest of the present church. She also paid for St Catherine's Church to be built in Littlehampton in 1862. In 1884, a temporary church building was constructed in Heron's Ghyll, it was made of iron. In 1886, she died. In 1891, her grandson, James Hope, 1st Baron Rankeillour bought the site from the Duchy of Norfolk and set about building a permanent church.

=== Construction ===
In 1895, Frederick Walters was commissioned to design the church. On 9 May 1896, the foundation stone was laid. Construction of the church cost £4,000. On 22 September 1897, the church was opened. By 1904, the debt of constructing the church had been fully paid, so on 7 September 1904, the church was consecrated by the Bishop of Southwark, Peter Amigo.

== Parishes ==
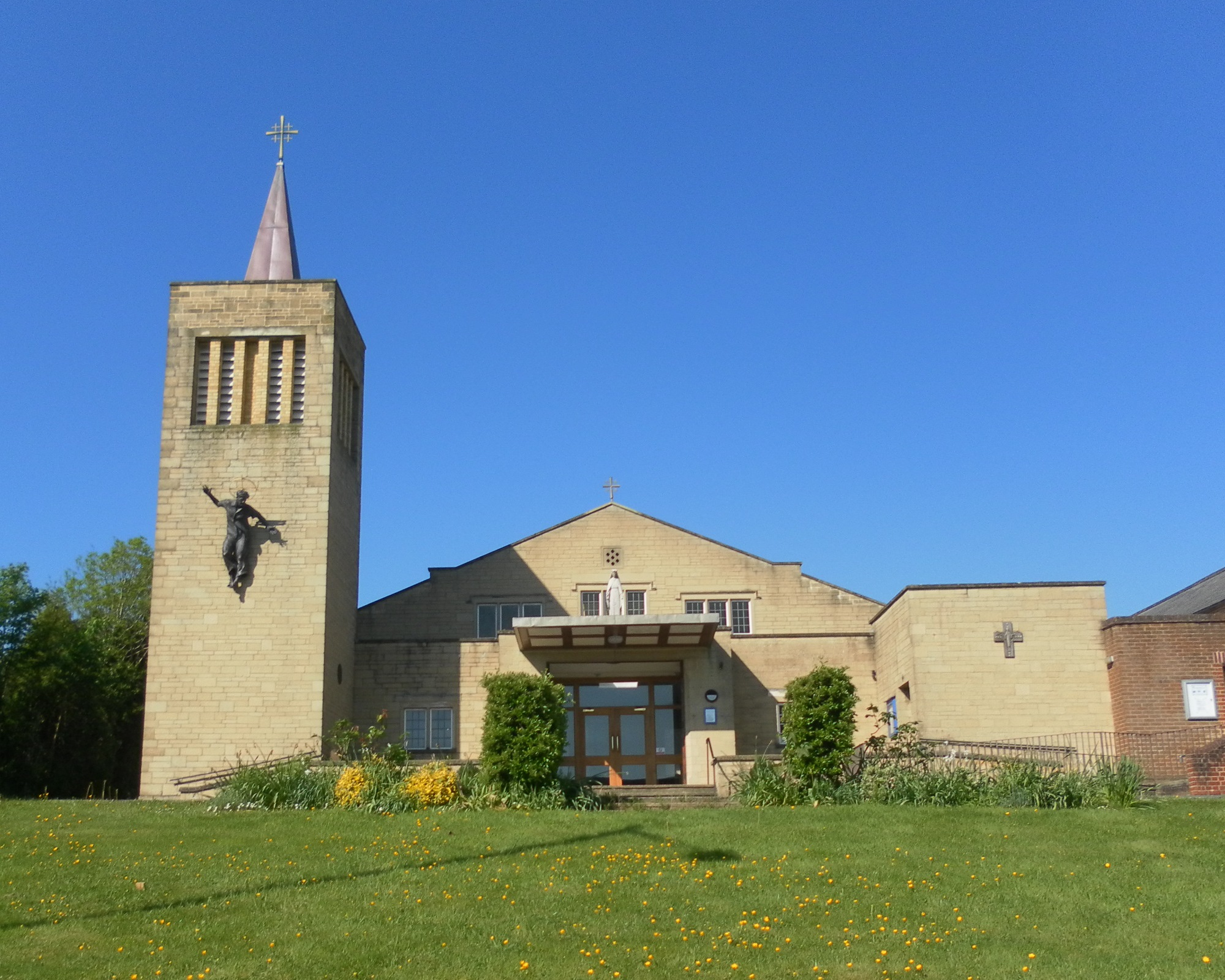
Our Lady Immaculate and St Philip Neri Church, Uckfield

The priest at St John's Church also serves the nearby parish of Our Lady Immaculate and St Philip Neri Church in Uckfield.

=== Our Lady Immaculate and St Philip Neri Church ===
Our Lady Immaculate and St Philip Neri Church was built in 1958 and designed by its parish priest Fr Cyril P. Plummer. It is situated next to St Philip's Catholic Primary School on New Town Road. Inside the church, Edgar Holloway designed the three panels situated behind the altar. The lettering on those panels was done by Alan Taylor, and Joseph Cribb designed the three altars and, outside, the statue of Our Lady above the entrance. The stained-glass windows were made by Aleksander Klecki. Cribb, Taylor and Holloway were all connected with The Guild of St Joseph and St Dominic, which was situated in nearby Ditchling.

=== Times ===
There is one Sunday Mass at St John's Church, at 11:30am. Our Lady Immaculate and St Philip Neri Church as two Sunday Masses, at 5:30pm on Saturday and at 9:30am on Sunday.

== See also ==
- List of current places of worship in Wealden
- Roman Catholic Diocese of Arundel and Brighton
