= Eckstein baronets =

Extinct baronetcy in the Baronetage of the United Kingdom

The Eckstein Baronetcy, of Fairwarp in the County of Sussex, is a title in the Baronetage of the United Kingdom. It was created on 24 April 1929 for the German-born, a sometime South African gold mine developer Frederich Eckstein, for his services to the Sudan as chairman of the Sudan Plantations Syndicate. The baronetcy was extinct on the death of the second baronet.

Hermann Eckstein, brother of the first Baronet, was a mining magnate and banker.

== Eckstein baronets, of Fairwarp and the Sudan (1929) ==
- Sir Frederich Gustav Jonathan Eckstein, 1st Baronet (1857–1930)
- Sir Bernard Eckstein, 2nd Baronet (1894–1948)
