= Heron's Ghyll =

Hamlet in East Sussex, England

Coordinates: 51.02257°N 0.11094°E

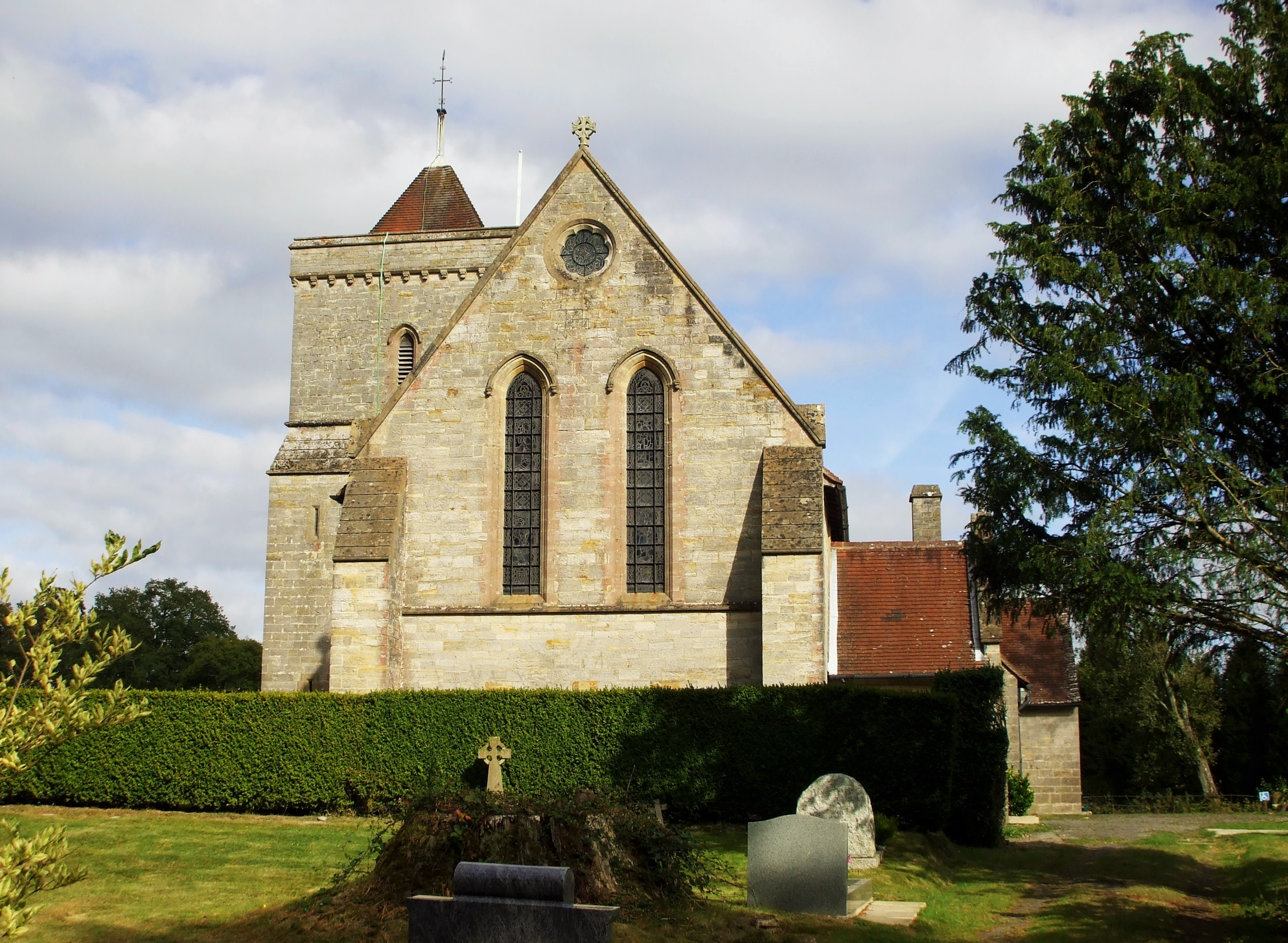
St John the Evangelist Church, a Catholic church in Heron's Ghyll, in 2009

Heron's Ghyll is a hamlet in the Wealden district of East Sussex in England. It is located between Crowborough and Uckfield on the A26 road, which forms the boundary between the civil parishes of Maresfield to the west and Buxted to the east. St John the Evangelist Church is a Catholic church in the hamlet, on the east side of the road. On the same side there is a house, also called Heron's Ghyll but also known as Buxted Hall, that was purchased by the poet Coventry Patmore in 1866; the house was occupied by Temple Grove School, a preparatory school, from 1935 until the school's closure in 2004. The house was subsequently converted into apartments and is now called Temple Grove House. The grounds include a late 19th-century garden laid out by Patmore. To the west of the A26 there is the Oldlands estate, also owned by Patmore between 1866 and 1869.
