= Tidebrook =

Hamlet in East Sussex, England

Coordinates: 51.045°N 0.300°E

Tidebrook is a hamlet within the parish of Wadhurst in East Sussex, England. It is located between the villages of Mayfield and Wadhurst. The brook for which the hamlet is named rises in the valley and forms one of the sources of the River Rother which meets the sea at Rye.

== Area and buildings ==
The main part of Tidebrook consists of 40 or so houses lying within the valley close to the main road from the Best Beech Inn to Rushers Cross. Although many other houses along Lake Street and Wadhurst Road also have a Tidebrook address. The centre point of the hamlet is the St. John the Baptist Church (built in 1856) in the bottom of the valley. Most of the houses within Tidebrook are either old farmhouses or cottages built for farm labourers with the exception of Tidebank Cottage, formerly the Fountain Pub and an old School house, formally Tidebrook School for girls which suffered a fire in the 1960s. Best Beech inn has closed and been converted to residences. Tidebrook Church School, not to be confused with the school for girls, was damaged by a doodle bug on 3rd August 1944. The school was deemed uneconomical to repair and was closed.

== Residents ==
The majority of current Tidebrook residents either work in the nearby villages or commute to London although there are still working farms in Tidebrook. The community is still very much intact with events such as horse trailer carol singing at Christmas and Tidebrook Fete being highlights in the year.

== Industry ==
From the 16th to the 18th century Tidebrook formed part of the strong local Iron industry, signs of which can still be seen in the area.

== Wildlife ==
The area remains unspoiled by the nearby expanding towns and villages and there is much wildlife to be seen. In recent years the number of badgers in the area has multiplied.
