= Fairwarp =

Village in East Sussex, England

Coordinates: 51.020185°N 0.094935°E

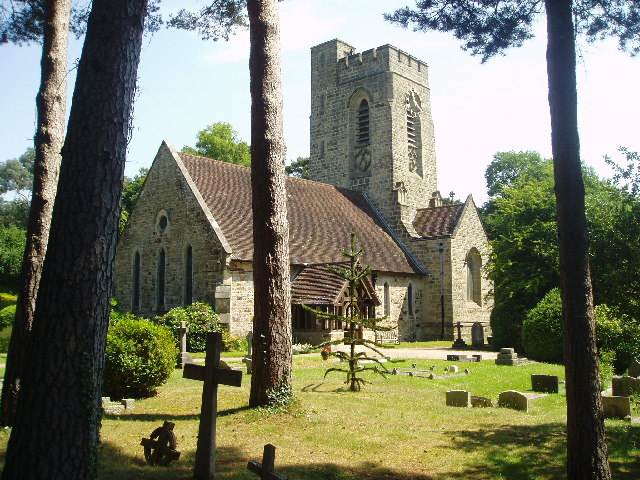
- Christ Church at Fairwarp

- Location within East Sussex
- OS grid reference: TQ4703126623
- District: Wealden
- Shire county: East Sussex
- Region: South East
- Country: England
- Sovereign state: United Kingdom
- Post town: UCKFIELD
- Postcode district: TN22
- Dialling code: 01825
- Police: Sussex
- Fire: East Sussex
- Ambulance: South East Coast
- UK Parliament: Wealden

Fairwarp is a small village within the civil parish of Maresfield in the Wealden district of East Sussex, England. Its nearest town is Uckfield, which lies approximately 3.3 miles (5.3 km) south from the village, just off the B2026 road.

Reginald John Campbell, British Congregationalist and Anglican divine, died at his home in the village in 1956.

The actors Joan Tetzel and Oscar Homolka are buried together at Christ Church.
