= Lewina =

7th-century British martyr

Saint Lewine
- Born: Britain
- Died: 7th century
- Venerated in: Seaford, Sussex
- Canonized: Pre-congregation
- Feast: 24 July

Saint Lewina (or Lewinna, Levinna, Lewine, Leofwynn; 7th century) was a British virgin and martyr who was put to death by Saxon invaders. Her feast day is 24 July.

== Life ==
Little is known of Lewinna's life. One source says she was a British woman who lived during the reign of King Ecgberht of Kent (r. 664–673). As a virgin, she was killed by a Saxon heathen due to her faith during the life of Archbishop Theodore of Tarsus (died 690). She was buried at a monastery in Sussex dedicated to Saint Andrew. Possibly Saint Lewinna's name is connected with that of the town of Lewes, which once had a church of Saint Andrew and is near Seaford. Lewinna may be the Latin version of Leofwynn, a Saxon rather than British name. She has been associated with Bishopstone, also near Seaford.

A Benedictine monk called Drogo from the abbey of Bergues in Flanders wrote a lengthy account of the removal of Lewina's relics in 1058 by another monk of Bergues named Balgerus. Balgerus sailed in a merchant vessel to England, and after riding out a storm landed in Sevordt (Seaford). The next day he went to Saint Andrew's Abbey, 2 leagues (6 mi; 10 km) away, where he was told Lewinna's body lay. He heard of the miracles wrought by the saint, and after struggling with his conscience stole her relics and took them to his ship. They were carried to the monastery at Bergues and stored in a chest adorned with gold and silver. In 1522 they were destroyed during some religious disturbances.

== Monks of Ramsgate account ==
The Monks of Ramsgate wrote in their Book of Saints (1921),

LEWINA (St.) V.M. (July 25)
(5th cent.) Concerning this Saint we have only a tradition that she was a British virgin put to death as a Christian by the Saxon invaders of the island. She was venerated at Seaford in Sussex, whither her relics were translated (A.D. 1058). Many miracles are recorded as having been wrought at her tomb.

== Dunbar's account ==
Agnes Baillie Cunninghame Dunbar (1830–1920) in her Dictionary of Saintly Women (1904) wrote,

St. Lewine or Levinna, July 22, 24, V.M. A British maiden, said to be of royal birth, supposed to have suffered martyrdom from some pagan Saxon in the 7th century. Her body was kept in a monastery at Seaford, near Lewes in Sussex, and translated in 1058 to Berg St. Winoc in Flanders, where her feast is observed, July 24. The abbey was burnt and her body in it, 1558. The history of the translation and of the miracles then wrought was written by Drogo, a contemporary historian. These miracles are recorded also by the Calvinist century writers of Magdeburg. AA.SS. Migne. Butler. Brit. Sand. Martin.

== Butler's account ==
The hagiographer Alban Butler (1710–1773) wrote in his Lives of the Fathers, Martyrs, and Other Principal Saints, under July 24,

St. Lewine, Virgin and Martyr She was a British virgin, who suffered martyrdom under the Saxons before their conversion to the faith. Her body was honourably kept at Seaford near Lewes in Sussex, till, in 1058, her remains, with those of St. Idaberga, virgin, and part of those of St. Oswald, were conveyed into Flanders, and are now deposited in St. Winock’s abbey at Berg. They have been honoured by many miracles, especially at the time of this translation, as even the century-writers of Magdeburg mention. A history of these miracles, written by Drogo, an eye-witness to several, is published by Solier the Bollandist, p. 608. t. 5. Jul. See also Alford in Annal. ad an. 687. n. 21.

== Sources ==
- Blaauw, W. H. (5 May 1847), "On the translation of Saint Lewinna from Seaford, in 1058" (PDF), Sussex Archaeological Collections, 1, doi:10.5284/1086835
- Butler, Alban (1833), The Lives of the Fathers, Martyrs, and Other Principal Saints: Compiled from Original Monuments and Other Authentic Records, Illustrated with the Remarks of Judicious Modern Critics and Historians, R. Coyne This article incorporates text from this source, which is in the public domain.
- Dunbar, Agnes B.C. (1904). A Dictionary of Saintly Women. Vol. 1. George Bell and Sons. p. 459 – via Wikisource. This article incorporates text from this source, which is in the public domain.
- Gittos, Helen (2013), Liturgy, Architecture, and Sacred Places in Anglo-Saxon England, Oxford: Oxford University Press, ISBN 978-0-19-927090-3
- Leyser, Henrietta (2015), Beda: A Journey to the Seven Kingdoms at the Time of Bede, Head of Zeus, ISBN 9781781853863
- St. Augustine's Abbey, Ramsgate (1921). The Book of saints : a dictionary of servants of God canonized by the Catholic Church. London: A. & C. Black, ltd. OCLC 671676136. This article incorporates text from this source, which is in the public domain.
