= List of schools in East Sussex =

This is a list of schools in East Sussex, England.

== State-funded schools ==
=== Primary schools ===
- Alfriston School, Alfriston
- All Saints' and St Richard's CE Primary School, Old Heathfield
- All Saints CE Junior Academy, Hastings
- All Saints CE Primary School, Sidley
- Annecy RC Primary School, Seaford
- Ark Blacklands Primary Academy, Hastings
- Ark Castledown Primary Academy, Hastings
- Ark Little Ridge Primary Academy, St Leonards-on-Sea
- Ashdown Primary School, Crowborough
- The Baird Primary Academy, Hastings
- Barcombe CE Primary School, Barcombe Cross
- Battle and Langton CE Primary School, Battle
- Beckley CE Primary School, Beckley
- Blackboys CofE Primary School, Blackboys
- Bodiam CE Primary School, Bodiam
- Bonners CE School, Maresfield
- Bourne Primary School, Eastbourne
- Breakwater Academy, Newhaven
- Brede Primary School, Brede
- Burwash CE School, Burwash
- Buxted CE Primary School, Buxted
- Catsfield CE Primary School Catsfield
- The Cavendish School, Eastbourne
- Chailey St Peter's CE Primary School, North Chailey
- Chantry Community Primary School, Bexhill-on-Sea
- Chiddingly Primary School, Chiddingly
- Christ Church CE Primary Academy, St Leonards-on-Sea
- Churchwood Primary Academy, St Leonards-on-Sea
- Chyngton School, Seaford
- Cradle Hill Community Primary School, Seaford
- Cross-in-Hand CE Primary School, Cross In Hand
- Crowhurst CE Primary School, Crowhurst
- Dallington CE Primary School, Dallington
- Danehill CE Primary School, Danehill
- Denton Community Primary School, Denton
- Ditchling St Margaret's CE Primary School, Ditchling
- Dudley Infant Academy, Hastings
- East Hoathly CE Primary School, East Hoathly
- Etchingham CE Primary School, Etchingham
- Firle CE Primary School, Firle
- Five Ashes CE Primary School, Five Ashes
- Fletching CE Primary School, Fletching
- Forest Row CE Primary School, Forest Row
- Framfield CE Primary School, Framfield
- Frant CE Primary School, Frant
- Gildredge House Free School, Eastbourne
- Glenleigh Park Primary Academy, Bexhill-on-Sea
- Groombridge St Thomas' CE Primary School, Groombridge
- Grovelands Community Primary School, Hailsham
- Guestling-Bradshaw CE Primary School, Guestling
- Hailsham Community College, Hailsham
- Hamsey Community Primary School, Lewes
- Hankham Primary School, Hankham
- Harbour Primary School and Nursery, Newhaven
- Harlands Primary School, Uckfield
- The Haven CE/Methodist Primary School, Eastbourne
- Hawkes Farm Academy, Hailsham
- Hellingly Community Primary School, Hellingly
- Heron Park Primary Academy, Eastbourne
- Herstmonceux CE Primary School, Herstmonceux
- High Cliff Academy, Newhaven
- High Hurstwood CE Primary School, High Hurstwood
- Hollington Primary Academy, St Leonards-on-Sea
- Hurst Green CE Primary School, Hurst Green
- Icklesham CE Primary School, Icklesham
- Iford and Kingston CE Primary School, Kingston
- Jarvis Brook Primary School, Jarvis Brook
- King Offa Primary Academy, Bexhill-on-Sea
- Langney Primary Academy, Eastbourne
- Laughton Community Primary School, Laughton
- Little Common School, Bexhill-on-Sea
- Little Horsted CE Primary School, Little Horsted
- Manor Primary School, Uckfield
- Mark Cross CE Primary School, Mark Cross
- Mayfield CE Primary School, Mayfield
- Maynard's Green Community Primary School, Maynard's Green
- Meridian Community Primary School, Peacehaven
- Motcombe Infants' School, Eastbourne
- Netherfield CE Primary School, Netherfield
- Newick CE Primary School, Newick
- Ninfield CE Primary School, Ninfield
- Northiam CE Primary School, Northiam
- Nutley CE Primary School, Nutley
- Oakwood Primary Academy, Eastbourne
- Ocklynge Junior School, Eastbourne
- Ore Village Primary Academy, Hastings
- Park Mead Primary School, Upper Dicker
- Parkland Infant School, Eastbourne
- Parkland Junior School, Eastbourne
- Parkside Community Primary School, Heathfield
- Pashley Down Infant School, Eastbourne
- Peacehaven Heights Academy, Peacehaven
- Peasmarsh CE Primary School, Peasmarsh
- Pebsham Primary Academy, Pebsham
- Pevensey and Westham CE Primary School, Westham
- Plumpton Primary School, Plumpton Green
- Polegate Primary School, Eastbourne
- Punnett's Town Community Primary School, Punnett's Town
- Ringmer Primary School, Ringmer
- Robsack Wood Primary Academy, St Leonards-on-Sea
- Rocks Park Primary School, Uckfield
- Roselands Infants' School, Eastbourne
- Rotherfield Primary School, Rotherfield
- Rye Community Primary School, Rye
- Sacred Heart RC Primary School, Hastings
- St Andrew's CE Infants School, Eastbourne
- St John's CE Primary School, St John's
- St John's Meads CE Primary School, Eastbourne
- St Leonards CE Primary Academy, St Leonards-On-Sea
- St Mark's CE Primary School, Hadlow Down
- St Mary Magdalene's RC Primary School, Bexhill-on-Sea
- St Mary Star of the Sea RC Primary School, St Leonards-On-Sea
- St Mary the Virgin CE Primary School, Hartfield
- St Marys RC Primary School, Crowborough
- St Michael's CE Primary School, Playden
- St Michael's Primary School, Withyham
- St Paul's CE Academy, St Leonards-On-Sea
- St Peter & St Paul CE Primary School, Bexhill-on-Sea
- St Philip's RC Primary School, Uckfield
- St Thomas a Becket Catholic Primary School, Eastbourne
- St Thomas' CE Primary School, Winchelsea
- Salehurst CE Primary School, Salehurst
- Sandown Primary School, Hastings
- Seaford Primary School, Seaford
- Sedlescombe CE Primary School, Sedlescombe
- Shinewater Primary School, Langney
- Silverdale Primary Academy, St Leonards-on-Sea
- Sir Henry Fermor CE Primary School, Crowborough
- South Malling CE Primary School, Lewes
- Southover CE Primary School, Lewes
- Stafford Junior School, Eastbourne
- Staplecross Methodist Primary School, Staplecross
- Stone Cross School, Stone Cross
- Stonegate CE Primary School, Stonegate
- Telscombe Cliffs Academy, Telscombe Cliffs
- Thornton Grove Primary School, Hailsham
- Ticehurst and Flimwell CE Primary School, Ticehurst
- Tollgate Community Junior School, Eastbourne
- Wadhurst CE Primary School, Wadhurst
- Wallands Community Primary School, Lewes
- West Rise Community Primary School, Eastbourne
- West St Leonard's Primary Academy, West St Leonards
- Western Road Community Primary School, Lewes
- Westfield School, Westfield
- White House Academy, Hailsham
- Willingdon Primary School, Willingdon
- Wivelsfield Primary School, Wivelsfield

=== Secondary schools ===
- Ark Alexandra Academy, Hastings
- Beacon Academy, Crowborough
- Bexhill High Academy, Bexhill-on-Sea
- The Cavendish School, Eastbourne
- Chailey School, South Chailey
- Claverham Community College, Battle
- The Eastbourne Academy, Eastbourne
- Gildredge House Free School, Eastbourne
- Hailsham Community College, Hailsham
- Hastings Academy, Hastings
- Heathfield Community College, Heathfield
- King's Academy, Ringmer
- Peacehaven Community School, Peacehaven
- Priory School, Lewes
- Ratton School, Eastbourne
- Robertsbridge Community College, Robertsbridge
- Rye College, Rye
- St Catherine's College, Eastbourne
- The St Leonards Academy, St Leonards-on-Sea
- St Richard's Catholic College, Bexhill-on-Sea
- Seaford Head School, Seaford
- Seahaven Academy, Newhaven
- The Turing School, Eastbourne
- Uckfield College, Uckfield
- Uplands Academy, Wadhurst
- Willingdon Community School, Lower Willingdon

=== Special and alternative schools ===
- College Central, Eastbourne
- Cuckmere House School, Seaford
- The Flagship School, Hastings
- Glyne Gap School, Bexhill-on-Sea
- Grove Park School, Crowborough
- Hazel Court School, Eastbourne
- The Lindfield School, Eastbourne
- New Horizons School, St Leonards-on-Sea
- The Ropemakers' Academy, Hailsham
- St Mary's School, Horam
- Saxon Mount School, St Leonards-on-Sea
- The South Downs School, Eastbourne
- Summerdown School, Eastbourne
- Torfield School, Hastings
- The Workplace, Bexhill-on-Sea

=== Further education ===
- Bexhill College
- Plumpton College
- Sussex Coast College Hastings
- Sussex Downs College

== Independent schools ==
=== Primary and preparatory schools ===
- Annan School, Framfield
- Bede's School, Eastbourne
- Sacred Heart School, Durgates
- St Andrew's Prep, Eastbourne
- Skippers Hill Manor Preparatory School, Five Ashes
- Vinehall School, Robertsbridge

=== Senior and all-through schools ===
- Battle Abbey School, Battle
- Bede's School, Upper Dicker
- Buckswood School, Guestling
- Claremont School, Baldslow
- Darvell School, Robertsbridge
- Eastbourne College, Eastbourne
- Greenfields School, Forest Row
- Lewes Old Grammar School, Lewes
- Mayfield School, Mayfield
- Northease Manor School, Rodmell

=== Special and alternative schools ===
- Anderida Learning Centre, Eastbourne
- Chailey Heritage School, North Chailey
- Frewen College, Northiam
- Headstart, Ninfield
- ISP School Battle, Battle
- Michael Hall School, Forest Row
- Mountfield Heath School, John's Cross
- Owlswick School, Kingston
- St Mary's School and 6th Form College, Bexhill-on-Sea
- Step by Step School, Forest Row
- VTSS, Cross-in-Hand
