= Arlington, East Sussex =

Village and parish in East Sussex, England

Coordinates: 50.84°N 0.19°E

Arlington
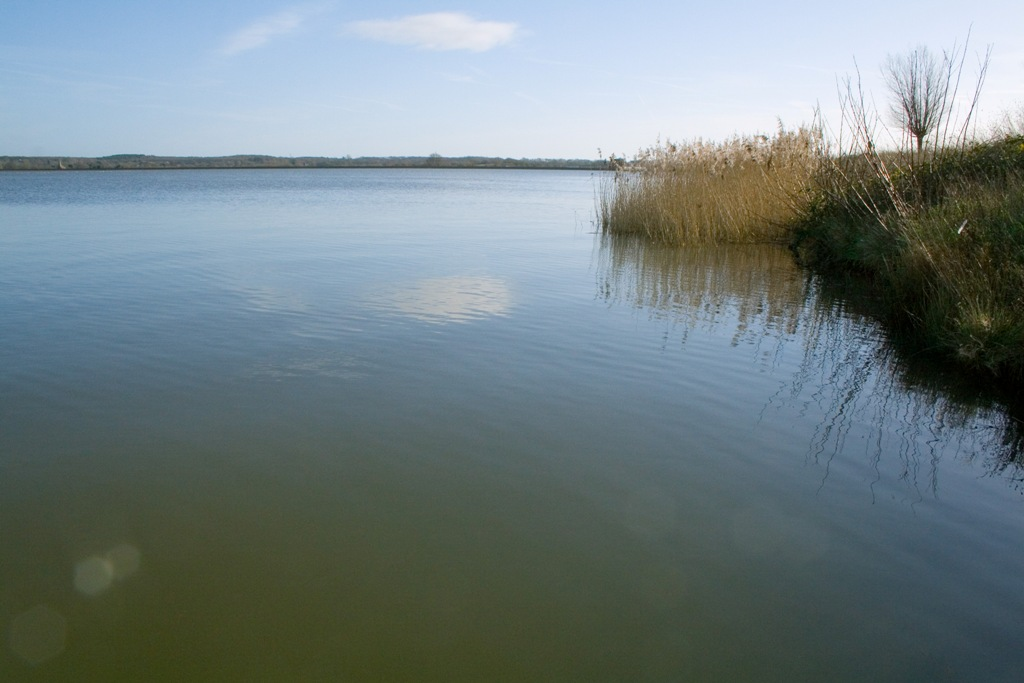
- Arlington Reservoir

- Location within East Sussex
- Area: 18.4 km^{2} (7.1 sq mi)
- Population: 490 (2007); 770 (2011)
  - Density: 69/sq mi (27/km^{2})
- OS grid reference: TQ543072
  - London: 47 miles (76 km) NNW
- District: Wealden
- Shire county: East Sussex
- Region: South East
- Country: England
- Sovereign state: United Kingdom
- Post town: POLEGATE
- Postcode district: BN26
- Post town: HAILSHAM
- Postcode district: BN27
- Dialling code: 01323
- Police: Sussex
- Fire: East Sussex
- Ambulance: South East Coast
- UK Parliament: Lewes
- Website: Arlington Parish Council

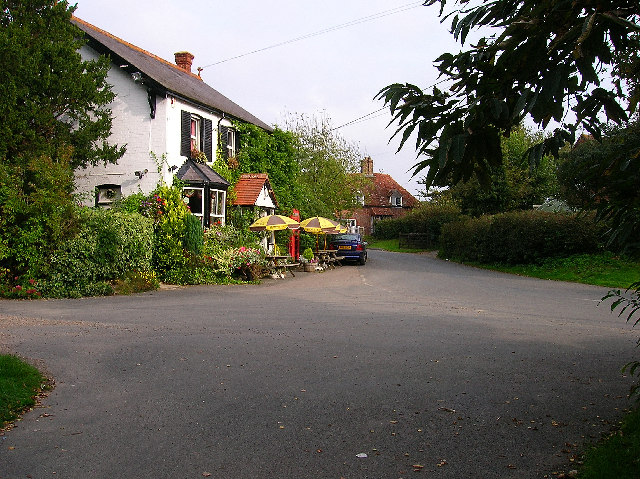

Arlington is a village and civil parish in the Wealden district of East Sussex, England. The parish is on the River Cuckmere, and is the location of a medieval priory, a reservoir and a car racetrack.

== History ==
Arlington is recorded in the Domesday Book of 1086 when it comprised five households and ploughing lands, but the area has been settled since Anglo-Saxon times. It is suggested that the wooden church in Arlington built by them, having been destroyed by invaders, was later rebuilt with bricks from the nearby Roman road. Apart from the Anglo-Saxon type of quoin stones, the church shows a splayed window of Anglo-Saxon type next to the porch. Supporting an early date is the dedication of the church to St Pancras, the Roman martyr, relics of whom were given to one of the Anglo-Saxon kings: he was reputed to be a teenager when put to death in one of the Roman persecutions of Christians. There is a statue of this saint in the RC church at Lewes: it is reasonable, therefore, to suppose that the church at Arlington dates from early in the Anglo-Saxon period. It was enlarged in the 13th century. Michelham Priory, at Upper Dicker, was founded by the Augustinians in 1229. Today it is a tourist site.

== Geography ==
Arlington village stands above the left bank of the River Cuckmere. The parish includes the two villages of Arlington and Upper Dicker. It is on a minor road leading north from the A27 road between Polegate and Lewes, and near Berwick railway station on the East Coastway Line. The village of Upper Dicker, the site of a medieval trade centre (Dicker = barter), is on the river, 1 1/2 miles (2.4 km) to the north.

Arlington Reservoir, on the opposite side of the river, was opened in 1971, and supplies water to the local area, including Eastbourne. It is situated at the foot of the South Downs and is a conservation site, being both a local nature reserve and a Site of Special Scientific Interest. It is an important site for bird life, with up to 170 species breeding in the area and 10,000 migrating birds using it each year and is popular with walkers, and for horse riders and anglers.

Another SSSI within the parish is Lower Dicker, a disused quarry and an important site for the study of the palaeogeography of the Weald. Its geology of sand and sandstone indicating ancient river flows in the area.

Some wild privet of the native species can be observed growing in the hedges in winter time.

== Governance ==
Locally Arlington is part of Wealden District Council.

Arlington is represented in the UK Parliament by the Lewes constituency. The current serving MP is the Liberal Democrat James MacCleary who won the seat in the 2024 general election.

== Amenities ==
There are two village halls in the parish, at Arlington and Upper Dicker. That at Arlington holds a weekly Art Club and a village market. There are three public houses: The Yew Tree Inn situated near the church; The Old Oak Inn in Caneheath, a hamlet to the east of Arlington; and The Plough Inn at Upper Dicker. The barn behind the listed Old Oak Inn is roofed with very rare and unusual Broomhall (Taylor's Patent) roof tiles, made by the Broomhall Brick & Tile Co. of Blackfriars, London. Broomhall stopped trading in 1916. Arlington also has its very own Tea Garden/ Nursery on Wilbees Road. Education is provided at Park Mead Infants School; and at St Bede's Independent Boarding School, Upper Dicker. The post office at Upper Dicker (first mentioned in 1852, when a type of postmark known as an undated circle was issued), was closed in 2008.

== Religion ==
Arlington parish church is dedicated to St Pancras. The church at Upper Dicker is dedicated to the Holy Trinity.

== Raceway ==
Arlington Stadium, near Michelham Priory, used regularly in the summer for race meets. Arlington is also often referred to as Eastbourne and is one of the longest serving stock car tracks in the UK having opened in 1955. Racing contested is Superstox, Banger racing and Motorcycle speedway. The stadium is the home of speedway team the Eastbourne Eagles. The stadium had its own team in the car racing leagues contested in the 1966 and 1972 seasons, also known as the Eastbourne Eagles. Stock Car racing normally takes place on Wednesday evenings and Bank Holidays during the summer months.
