= St Catherine's College, Eastbourne =

St Catherine's College

Location
- Priory Road; Eastbourne, East Sussex, BN23 7BL; England
- Coordinates: 50°47′56″N 0°19′02″E

Information
- Type: Academy
- Motto: We are: Ambitious, Hard-working, Resilient, Responsible.
- Religious affiliation: Church of England
- Local authority: East Sussex
- Department for Education URN: 143035 Tables
- Ofsted: Reports
- Headteacher: Solomon Berhane
- Gender: Coeducational
- Age: 11 to 16
- Enrolment: 1,025
- Website: http://www.stcatherines.college/

St Catherine's College (previously The Bishop Bell Church of England Mathematics & Computing Specialist School) is a coeducational Church of England secondary school situated on the south coast of England in Eastbourne. The school is part of the Diocese of Chichester Academy Trust.

== History ==
Formerly Bedewell School on Whitley Road, Eastbourne, (the town's Fire Station now stands on the old site) it was reopened in its current location in Priory Road on 25 May 1959 by Princess Margaret. It was named after Bishop George Bell, who ordered its construction and of whom there is a painting in the school. The old site was commemorated with the addition of a Science and Technology building across the road from the main site, which is named Bedewell. The two sites are joined by a skywalk which cost £800,000 in 2004, replacing an outdoor metal bridge which had been deemed impractical.

There have been several ecclesiastical visits from Bishops and members of the Christian faith. The school has had visits from the Quicken Trust, a Christian organisation which works with people in Kabubu, Africa. Bishop Bell has links with Schlenker Secondary school from Freetown, Sierra Leone, within which it helped to implement an IT centre in 2008.

In January 2016 the school announced that it would shortly be renamed. This was after the Diocese of Chichester paid compensation and apologised after sex abuse allegations were made against Bishop George Bell in a civil claim. The school was renamed St Catherine's College.

== Performance ==
Following a period of poor performance, the school's educational achievement improved when Terry Boatwright became head teacher in 1995. There was an increase in the number of pupils achieving 5 A*-C grade GCSEs for eleven consecutive years. By 1999 it was one of the top improving schools in the country; this was attributed to Boatwright by the local MP. By 2006 the school was oversubscribed. In 2014, Boatwright retired as headteacher, with Mark Talbot replacing him.

Since then, school performance has dropped severely, and now it is the second-worst school in Eastbourne, in front of only The Causeway School.

In March 2018, Mark Talbot announced that he was resigning as Principal of the school, after being appointed CEO of the Diocese of Chichester Academy Trust. In May 2018, the school announced that Solomon Berhane would be replacing Mr Talbot starting September that year.

== Curriculum ==
The school educates students from Year 7 through to Year 11. The school offers pupils a range of voluntary and compulsory GCSE subjects which are taken from Year 9 to Year 11. There was a change after the academic year (2007–2008) in which the school started GCSEs at Year 10, with pupils deciding their subject choices the year before.

The school educates all of its pupils in Citizenship and Personal, Social and Health Education. English, Mathematics, Science, Religious Education and Physical Education are core subjects taught to all students throughout the entirety of their education at the school. The arts, technology and foreign languages are optional as GCSEs in the upper school.

The school is one of the only schools in East Sussex that teaches Mandarin Chinese, and has been awarded Confucius Classroom status by the Confucius Institute.

== School Day ==
During the 2017–2018 academic year, the school day lasted from 8:40am – 3:25pm. The day consisted of six 50-minute lessons, of which many lessons were doubled up to make 100-minute lessons. There was also a 35-minute Tutor period during the school day.

The current school day starts with a short Tutor period and consists of five 1-hour lessons. The school day finishes at 3:05pm, excluding for those undertaking GCSE exams, who will instead finish at 4pm.

== House System ==
In 2016, the school adopted a House system. There are 4 houses, each named after famous ships. The names of these houses are Endeavour (named after HMS Endeavour), Endurance (named after HMS Endurance), Invincible (name after HMS Invincible), and Valiant (named after HMS Valiant).

== Global Awareness group ==
St Catherine's College has a social justice group called the 'Global Awareness Group'. In 2008 the group undertook to make the school a 'fairtrade school' by encouraging fair trade use within the school. They sent each other parcels of fairtrade chocolates. In 2009, they succeeded. One event involved them trying to "set a world record of how many Fairtrade bananas could be eaten on one day"

== Child sexual abuse ==
The school has been at the centre of three major child safeguarding problems, including a child sexual abuse scandal:

- In February 2009, teaching assistant Robert Healy was jailed for seven years after he admitted grooming two girls using the social networking site Bebo, then having sex with them.
- Canon Gordon Rideout was allowed to remain chair of the school governors for more than a year despite having been suspended by the Church of England following a Criminal Records Bureau check and despite the school being aware. Rideout was jailed for 10 years in May 2013 for abusing 36 vulnerable girls and boys at a now closed Barnardo's home in Crawley, West Sussex, over a four-year period in the 1960s and 1970s.
- In September 2012, maths teacher Jeremy Forrest was arrested in Bordeaux, and subsequently charged by Sussex Police with the abduction of a 15-year-old female pupil. He was found guilty in June 2013, and after pleading guilty to five further charges of sexual activity with a child, was jailed for 5½ years. The judge said that Forrest had been repeatedly warned by colleagues but had lied to them and had been motivated by self-interest. Although a review published in April 2013 did not find evidence of "any significant or systemic failings in safeguarding" following the Forrest verdict, there were calls for then-headteacher Terry Boatwright to be sacked.
