= Arlington Reservoir =

Protected area in East Sussex, England

Coordinates: 50.845°N 0.179°E

- Site of Special Scientific Interest
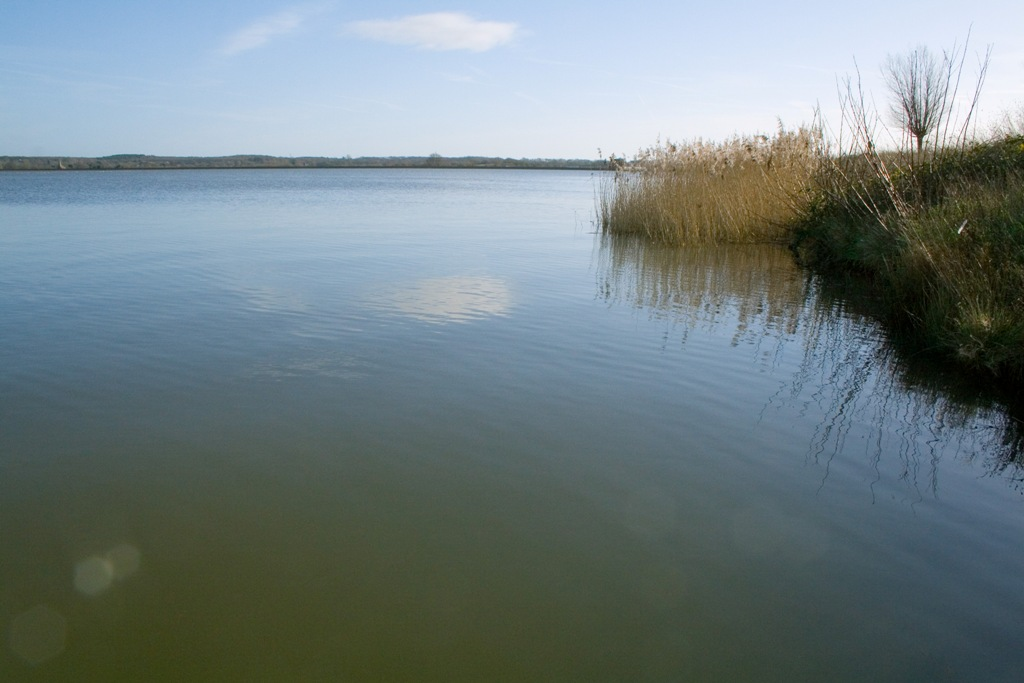
- Location of Arlington Reservoir.
- Area of search: East Sussex
- Grid reference: TQ 535 073
- Interest: Biological
- Area: 100.4 hectares (248 acres)
- Notification date: 1985
- Location map: Magic Map

Arlington Reservoir is a 100.4-hectare (248-acre) biological Site of Special Scientific Interest west of Hailsham in East Sussex, England. It is also a Local Nature Reserve and it is owned and managed by South East Water.

== Wildlife ==
The site is of ornithological interest, with over 1% of the total UK wintering wigeon being populated within the site. Alder Alnus glutinosa and willow Salix species are part of the open water. The site is also home to a scrub of hawthorn (Crataegus monogyna). A large jetty juts into the water a few hundred yards away from a water treatment building. The reservoir was originally created by damming the River Cuckmere, which previously meandered to the middle of the present-day reservoir. The Cuckmere is now channelled in a straight line just to the east.

Located on the northwest bank of the reservoir is the Osprey Birdhide. It is a popular place to view the population of cormorants which regularly visit to rest on the banks and trees surrounding the water. Other species include great crested grebe, swallow, mallard, pied wagtail, coot, Canada goose, rook, and sheep graze in the surrounding water meadows. Black swans, presumably escapees from captivity can often be seen on the water.
