= Seahaven FM =

- Eastbourne; England
- Broadcast area: East Sussex
- Frequencies: 95.6 MHz (Eastbourne); 96.3 MHz (Newhaven); DAB: 7D Hastings

Programming
- Format: Pop Music, Adult Contemporary, Classic Hits, Speech

Ownership
- Owner: Seahaven FM Broadcasting Limited

History
- First air date: 9 January 2011

Technical information
- Licensing authority: Ofcom

Links
- Webcast: Web Player
- Website: Seahaven FM

Seahaven FM is the local FM radio station covering Eastbourne, Lewes, Newhaven, Peacehaven, Polegate, Seaford on FM and Hastings and Bexhill on DAB+ all along the East Sussex coast.

Working from studios in Seaford under an Ofcom Community Radio Licence, on a not-for-profit basis. The station began broadcasting full-time on 96.3Mhz in January 2011. Initially covering Newhaven, Seaford and parts of Peacehaven. In 2019 coverage was enhanced improving the signal to the existing area and could also extending it to most of the county town of Lewes. At the end of November 2020 an extension was approved by Ofcom which enabled the station to cover all of Eastbourne which includes Polegate and Pevensey on 95.6Mhz. Then in September 2026 the station could be heard on the Hastings Small Scale DAB (SSDAB) multiplex.

== Programming and Music Policy ==
The station's programming focuses on music from multiple decades, featuring chart hits and popular songs from the 1950s to the present day. Its schedule includes music from genres and eras such as rock and roll, along with selections from the 1960s, 1970s, 1980s, 1990s, 2000s, 2010s, and 2020s. The station also participates in community activities through appearances by presenters and staff.

Daytime programming from 6 am to 7 pm primarily features music, while evening schedules include specialist music programmes and community-based talk shows that provide opportunities for local contributors to participate.

The station is run largely by local volunteers and includes a number of professional radio people. Norman Baker, the former MP for the Lewes constituency is one of the station's presenters.

== History ==
The station started streaming on the internet on 1 Feb 2008 and completed two short-term FM Restricted Service Licence (RSL) broadcasts one in March and the other in August 2008, it also provided facilities for two other RSL broadcasts by other groups.

In November 2008 Seahaven FM was one of the 48 stations in the South East who took part in the second round of applications to Ofcom for a Community Radio Licence. The station was successfully awarded the licence in September 2009 and announced it on its streaming service at 09:09 on the 09/09/09. It took a further 16 months to complete the work to launch the station full-time on FM. The launch took place on Sunday 9 January at 12:00 noon and the full-time schedule started at 7 am on Monday 10 January 2011.

In 2020 Ofcom approved an improvement in coverage on 96.3FM in the Newhaven/Peacehaven/Seaford/Lewes area, and on 30 November 2020 the station began broadcasting to the Eastbourne/Polegate/Pevensey area on 95.6FM adding DAB+ coverage in Hastings on 1 September 2026.

== Today ==
Seahaven FM covers about 60% of the total population of East Sussex and broadcasts along the south coast from Peacehaven to Hastings. It is a local radio show created by and for local people working and living in the area. It aims to both entertain and promote the best of the area.
