= Gildredge House Free School =

Location
- Compton Pl Rd; Eastbourne, East Sussex, BN20 8AB; England; 50°46′12″N 0°15′58″E

Information
- Type: Free school
- Established: 2013
- Local authority: East Sussex
- Department for Education URN: 139796 Tables
- Ofsted: Reports
- Chair of Governors: Julian Mace
- Head Teacher: Craig Bull
- Gender: Mixed
- Age: 4 to 19
- Enrolment: 357
- Website: http://www.gildredgehouse.org.uk/

Gildredge House Free School is a mixed free school located in Eastbourne, East Sussex, England. It opened in 2013 and caters for students aged 4–19 years. It is located on a former National Health Service site, which was vacated in 2012.

The school opened its sixth form in 2015 and is one of only a handful A Level providers in the town. At A Level students can study a variety of subjects from each faculty. Within mathematics and economics students can study mathematics, further mathematics and economics. Within science they can study biology, chemistry and physics. Within languages they can study Spanish, German, French and classical civilisation. Within humanities they can study psychology, philosophy, history, politics, sociology, geography and EPQ. Students can also study English and physical education.

== Ofsted ==
In June 2015, the school had its first Ofsted inspection, when the school was adjudged to be "Outstanding". The inspectors noted that the school was an exceptional learning environment. In November 2018 this had declined to "Good" with inspectors observing that "Not enough pupils make good progress from their starting points.The most able pupils do not achieve as well as they should. Disadvantaged pupils do not consistently make strong enough progress to catch up with their peers."
