= The Eastbourne Academy =

- Logo of The Eastbourne Academy

Location
- Brodrick Road; Eastbourne, East Sussex, BN22 9RQ; England; 50.8021°N 0.26926°E

Information
- Type: Academy
- Motto: Your future at your fingertips.
- Department for Education URN: 136106 Tables
- Ofsted: Reports
- Head teacher: Steve Rickard and Carly Rollings
- Gender: Coeducational
- Age: 11 to 16
- Capacity: 800
- Houses: Darwin, Franklin, Da Vinci
- Colours: Yellow, Green, Purple
- Website: www.theeastbourneacademy.org

The Eastbourne Academy (shortened to TEA) is a coeducational secondary school with academy status, located in Eastbourne in the English county of East Sussex.

Previously known as Eastbourne Technology College, the school converted to academy status in September 2010. It was previously a community school administered by East Sussex County Council. The school continues to coordinate with East Sussex County Council for admissions.

TEA is currently controlled by Swale Academies Trust.

The Eastbourne Academy offers GCSEs and BTECs, as programmes of study for pupils.
