= Lower Dicker =

Site of Specific Scientific Interest in East Sussex, England

Coordinates: 50.878°N 0.210°E

- Site of Special Scientific Interest
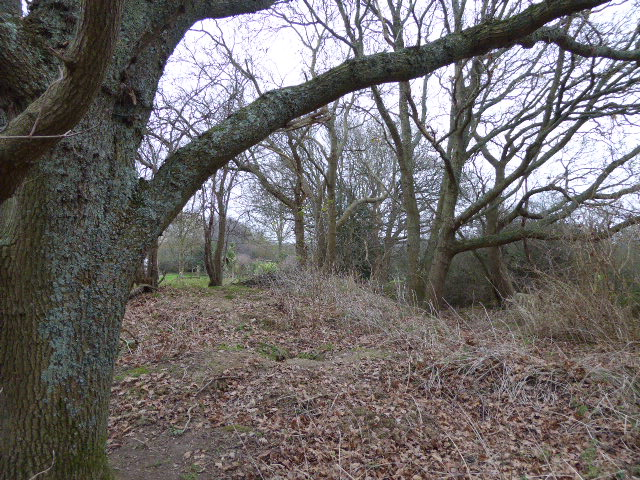
- Location of Lower Dicker.
- Area of search: East Sussex
- Grid reference: TQ 556 111
- Interest: Geological
- Area: 0.1 hectares (0.25 acres)
- Notification date: 1998
- Location map: Magic Map

Lower Dicker is a 0.1-hectare (0.25-acre) geological Site of Special Scientific Interest west of Hailsham in East Sussex. It is a Geological Conservation Review site.

== Geology ==
Exposures of a sand member are present in the quarry. The sand is of the lower division of the Weald Clay. The sandstone units of the Weald Clay Group represent river deposits which periodically extended into the Wealden lake or lagoon. The sandstones are important as lithostratigraphical markers (units of rock with the same affinity) and are considered to reflect the effects of tectonic uplift in nearby areas feeding sediment into the area. The mineralogy of these sandstones reflects their provenance and they are therefore of great importance for understanding the changes which took place in the palaeogeography of the Weald.

Upper Dicker provides the most southerly exposure of any of the Weald Clay sand members in Britain. It is also important for marking the furthest known extension eastwards of Cornubian (what is today Devon and Cornwall) debris (pieces of rock incorporated into the sandstones and clays), indicating the presence of a river system extending out of south-west England at this time.
