= Peacehaven Community School =

Location
- Greenwich Way; Peacehaven, East Sussex, BN10 8RB; England; 50°47′46″N 0°00′11″E

Information
- Type: Academy
- Motto: "Aspire, Believe, Contribute, Achieve "
- Established: 2001
- Local authority: East Sussex
- Department for Education URN: 144661 Tables
- Ofsted: Reports
- Head of school: Rachel Henocq
- Executive headteacher: Lisa Leung
- Gender: Mixed
- Age: 11 to 16
- Enrolment: 889 as of April 2016
- Houses: Jevington, Wilmington, Firle, Alfriston
- Multi-academy trust affiliation: Swale Academies Trust
- Website: Official website

Peacehaven Community School is a mixed secondary school for 11 to 16-year-olds in Peacehaven, East Sussex in the United Kingdom.

The school was opened in 2001 following a 40-year campaign by the local community for a secondary school in Peacehaven.

It is an academy administered and governed by the Swale Academies Trust, a status it gained in September 2019. The current head of school was Darren Warner-Swan with Liza Leung as executive headteacher on behalf of the trust.

Previously, it was a foundation school administered by East Sussex County Council and the Peacehaven Co-operative Learning Trust, with governance of the school being undertaken by an interim executive board between 2013 until 2018.

== Ofsted inspections ==
The school was inspected by Ofsted in 2013 and again in 2016. For both inspections, the school was awarded a grade 3 or 'requires improvement' mark overall, despite previously being a 'good' school. This was reflected in the then-latest exam results, released in August 2016, which showed only 38% of students achieving 5 A*-C GCSEs (or equivalent) inc. English and maths compared to the 53% national average. This was 4 points down on the previous year from 42%, despite local authority intervention in the governance of the school and consultation and guidance of the Swale Academies Trust.

It was once again inspected in October 2018, and was awarded a grade 2 or 'good' mark overall.

Following the academisation of the school, it has not yet had another inspection.

Summary table of Ofsted inspections
Year inspected	Ofsted grade	Headteacher
2018	Good	Rachel Joseph
2016	Requires improvement	Austen Hindman
2013	Requires improvement	Nicky Bassett
2011	Good	Helen Cryer
2008	Good	Helen Cryer

== Academy conversion controversy ==
Prior to being converted to academy status, parents and teachers went on strike in opposition over the plans, citing concerns such as a gender pay gap at the Swale Academies Trust and the way in which the conversion was imposed upon the school by an interim education board, garnering national press attention.

East Sussex County Council and the interim education board defended their decision, arguing "It remains our view and view of the Interim Executive Board (IEB) that this is the right course of action to secure strong leadership and continued improvements at the school."

Local MP Lloyd Russell-Moyle also campaigned heavily against academisation.

Nevertheless, the academisation process was completed in September 2019.
