= Willingdon Community School =

Location
- Broad Road; Lower Willingdon; Eastbourne, East Sussex, BN20 9QX; England; 50.8114°N 0.2407°E

Information
- Type: Community school
- Local authority: East Sussex
- Department for Education URN: 114592 Tables
- Ofsted: Reports
- Headteacher: Emily May
- Gender: Coeducational
- Age: 11 to 16
- Website: willingdonschool.org.uk

Willingdon Community School is an 11–16 coeducational secondary school located in the Lower Willingdon area of Eastbourne in the English county of East Sussex.

It is a community school administered by East Sussex County Council, and the council coordinates admissions to the school.

Willingdon Community School offers GCSEs and BTECs as programmes of study for pupils. The school has specialisms in the media and visual arts, and has also become a Leading Edge School.

== Description ==
Willingdon Community School is an average size secondary school for 11 to 16-year-olds, with specialist status for media and visual arts. It houses a special facility for hearing impaired students with statements of special educational needs, which is managed by the local authority; the students are on the school's roll and integrated into lessons. A small number of Traveller students attend the school; the great majority of students are monolingual White British. The school is a Leading Edge School and a Gifted and Talented Lead School.

"There is an organised, calm and positive ethos throughout the school, which is enhanced by strong relationships between staff and pupils. Staff have high expectations of pupils' conduct and, as a result, pupils are well behaved, respectful and friendly to one another. Behaviour is typically exemplary and there is a culture of inclusion across the school." reported Ofsted in 2017. There was a change of headteacher in 2016, and the new postholder reorganised the programme of teaching, the management committee structures and revised all the school policies, particularly those on quality assurance and teaching and learning. The new target-setting process ensured that the most able and 'low-prior-ability' pupils are suitably challenged by appropriate tasks.

Some pupils join the school with low literacy levels and this affects their ability to access the curriculum; weak literacy skills are the main barrier to success for many of the pupils. A whole-school literacy programme includes developing pupils' love of reading, while enhancing their oracy and improving their writing skills, has been adopted by many curriculum areas.

== Academics ==
At Key Stage 3, the curriculum complies with the statutory obligations to provide courses in National Curriculum subjects: English, Mathematics, Science, History, Geography, French, Design Technology, ICT, Art, Music, Drama and P.E., together with Religious Education which is delivered as 'Ethics and Philosophy', Citizenship, Careers education and Sex education. Key Stage 3 lasts for three years, year 9 however, is used to help students transition to the Key Stage 4 disciplines and some elements of the exam courses are started.

Every student, in years 10 and 11, follows examination courses in English (Language and Literature), mathematics and science (double or triple award), together with three options. The school has a fully comprehensive intake; the core subjects are taught in ability sets while the options are in the main taught in mixed ability groups.
