= Cavendish School, Eastbourne =

The Cavendish School
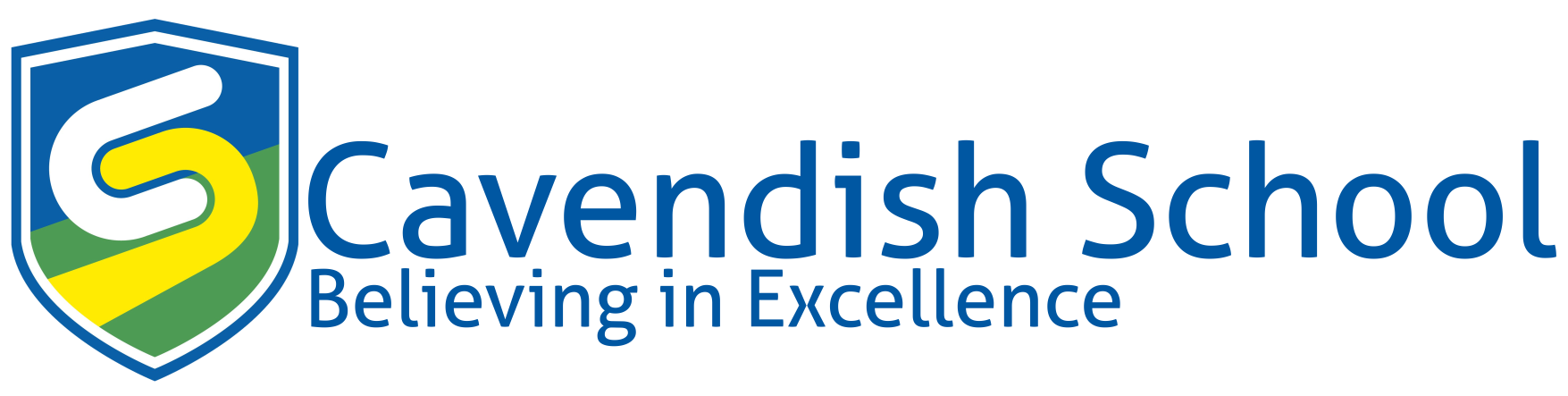

Location
- Eldon Road; Eastbourne, East Sussex, BN21 1UE; England; 50°46′49″N 0°15′38″E

Information
- Type: Academy
- Motto: Believing in Excellence
- Established: 1979; 47 years ago
- Founder: Douglas Moleheimer
- Department for Education URN: 138475 Tables
- Ofsted: Reports
- Chair of Governors: Andrew Jones
- Head teacher: Peter Marchant
- Gender: Coeducational
- Age: 2 to 16
- Enrolment: 862
- Security Level: Highly Restrictive, Chaperone required
- Website: www.cavendish.cet.uk

The Cavendish School, commonly known as Cavendish School or Cavendish, is a coeducational All-through school with academy status, located in Eastbourne, East Sussex in England for children aged 2 to 16.

The school converted to an Academy on 1 August 2012. In September 2016 the school's Pre-School and primary phase building was opened and the Cavendish School became an All-through school.

== History ==
The Cavendish School dates as far back as 1843, making it one of the longest-established schools in the area. It was in this year that actor Douglas Moleheimer established the first incarnation of The Cavendish School, in order to pass down his love of acting. A true ‘specialist school for the Arts’, The Cavendish School became an intrinsic part of Eastbourne life, and the name quickly grew within the town.

The current building was first opened as a Girls’ High School in 1939 but The Cavendish School was established on this site in 1979. An extension was built in 1982 and further programmes of building and refurbishment have been completed in the intervening years.

In September 2016 the school's primary phase building was opened.

In September 2017 the reception area was changed into a staff-only entrance, allowing the previously primary school entrance to become the dual reception for both schools, following a change of unity decided by the governing body. This change was followed with mixed opinions, especially with the increase in security measures - however, most parents and visitors understood the need following national events in 2016/17.
