= Hailsham =

Town in East Sussex, England

Coordinates: 50.8647°N 0.2577°E

- Town
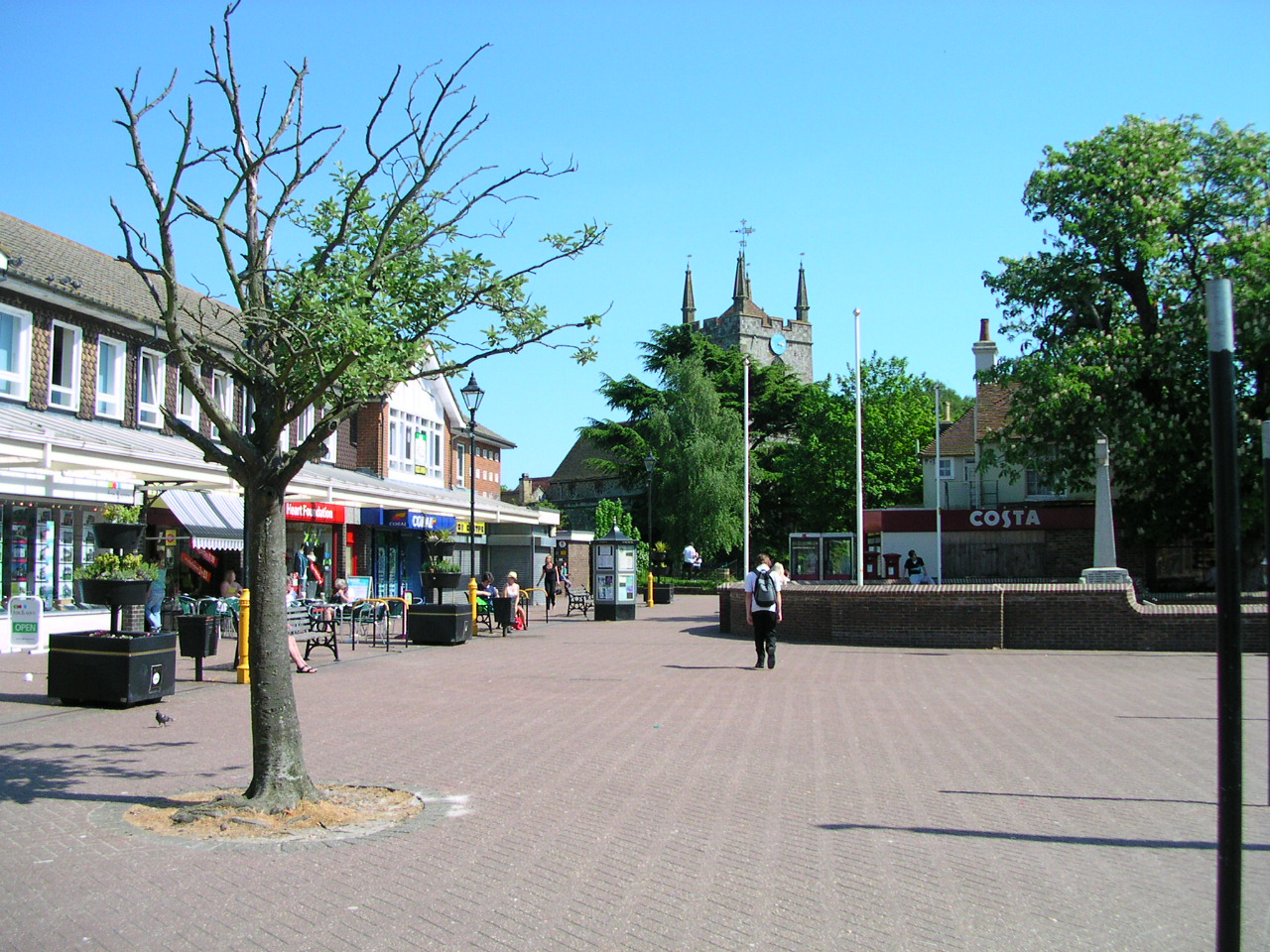
- Hailsham town centre

- Location within East Sussex
- Area: 19.4 km^{2} (7.5 sq mi)
- Population: 23,114 (2021 Census)
  - Density: 2,652/sq mi (1,024/km^{2})
- OS grid reference: TQ589093
  - London: 61.4 miles (98.8 km) NNW
- District: Wealden
- Shire county: East Sussex
- Region: South East
- Country: England
- Sovereign state: United Kingdom
- Post town: HAILSHAM
- Postcode district: BN27
- Dialling code: 01323
- Police: Sussex
- Fire: East Sussex
- Ambulance: South East Coast
- UK Parliament: Sussex Weald
- Website: http://www.hailsham-tc.gov.uk/

Hailsham is a town, civil parish and the administrative centre of the Wealden district of East Sussex, England. It lies near the Cuckmere River, approximately 17 miles (27 km) east of Brighton, 7 miles (11 km) north of Eastbourne, and 14 miles (23 km) west of Hastings. It had a population of 23,114 at the 2021 census.

Hailsham is mentioned in Domesday Book, where it is called Hamelesham in one part, yet mentioned in another part of the same book as ‘’’Tilux’’’, the land of Ricard de Tunbrige. The town of Hailsham has a history of industry and agriculture.

== Etymology ==
The name "Hailsham" is thought to come from the Saxon "Haegels Ham", meaning the clearing or settlement of Haegel, Hella or a similar name, possibly even "Aella's Ham", the clearing of Aella the Saxon. The name of the town has been spelt in various ways through the ages from ‘Hamelsham’ (as it was referred to in the Domesday Book), "Aylesham" in the 13th century, and later Haylesham, to its present spelling.

== History ==
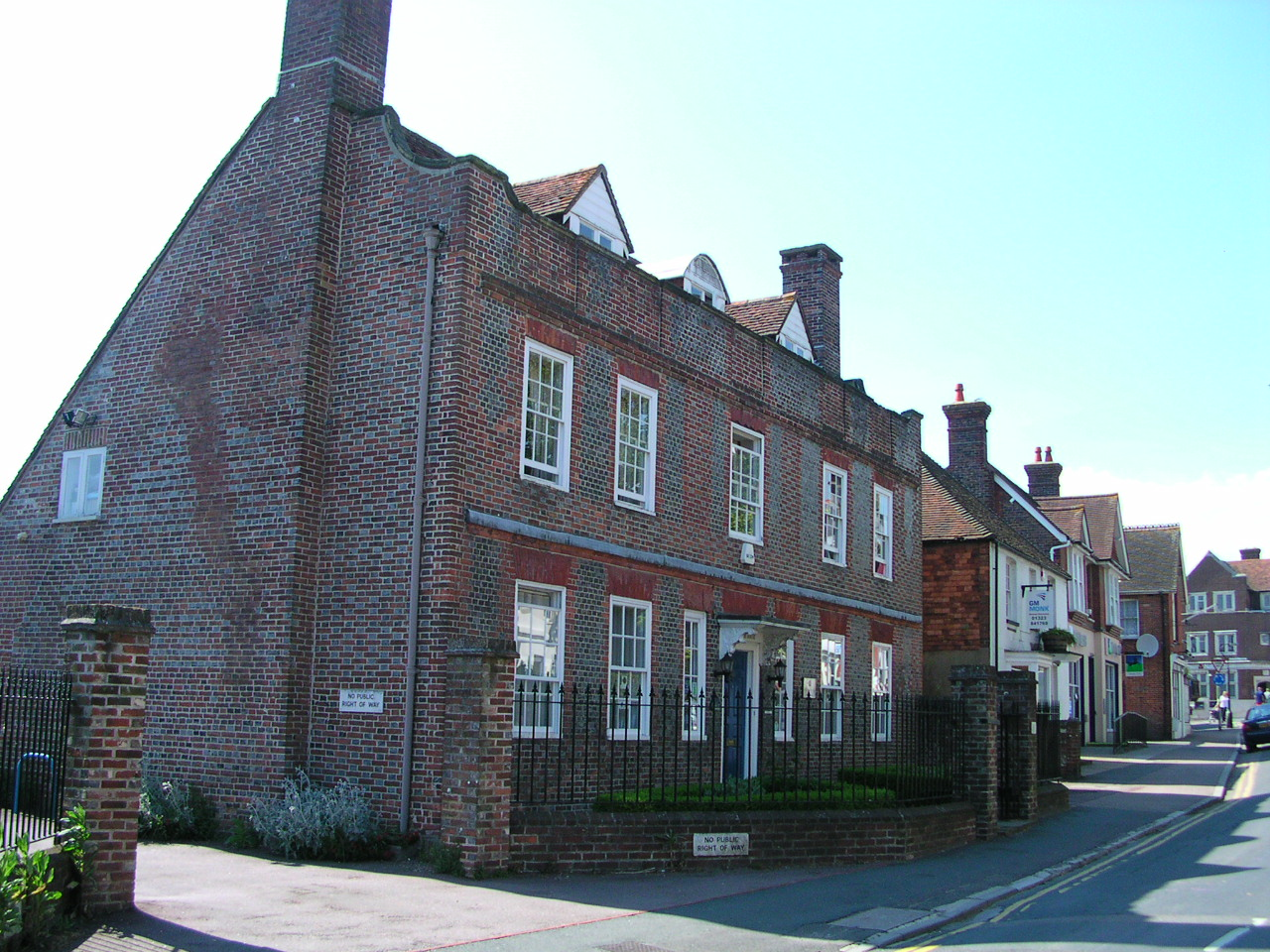
Hailsham, East Sussex

The site of Hailsham has been inhabited since at least the Neolithic age. It was an Ancient British settlement that existed before the Romans invaded Kent and Sussex in 43 AD. The Anglo Saxons invaded Sussex in the year 477 AD. The Saxons are thought to have invaded at an original landing place at Selsey. According to the Anglo-Saxon Chronicle, in 491 AD they attacked and took the British stronghold of Anderida which was the fort that is believed to have been built by the Ancient British and the Romans at what is now Pevensey, just a few miles from Hailsham, thereby consolidating their conquest and forming the small kingdom of the South Saxons, or Sussex.

In Roman and Saxon times, the lowland marsh area between Anderida and the site of Hailsham, today known as the Pevensey Levels, is presumed to be unreclaimed at that time, so that much of the levels would have been a saltmarsh and at high tide, a lagoon. The link between Hailsham and the levels is preserved in the name of the access routes such as Marshfoot Lane and Saltmarsh Lane.

The manor of Hailsham is recorded in the Domesday Survey completed by the Normans in 1086, 20 years after the conquest, when there were just four households, as well as ploughing land and salt houses. There was some activity in this part of Sussex during the baronial wars and in the armed rivalry between Matilda and Stephen.

During the 17th century civil war between Charles I and Parliament, Hailsham and this part of Sussex declared against the royalist cause.

Little is known of the town of Hailsham before the 1086 Domesday Book, but evidence of a Roman road from Leap Cross across the Common indicates some occupation prior to this.

=== Market town status ===
Henry III granted the town a Market Charter in 1252. Originally, the market was held in the High Street and in Market Square, only moving to its present location in 1868. Sheep and cattle were driven from miles around along the various ancient droves until the arrival of the railway station and motor lorries. Today, the weekly livestock markets, together with the monthly farmers’ market continue whilst stall markets are held weekly in the town centre on Saturdays or Thursdays.

=== Dates of significance ===
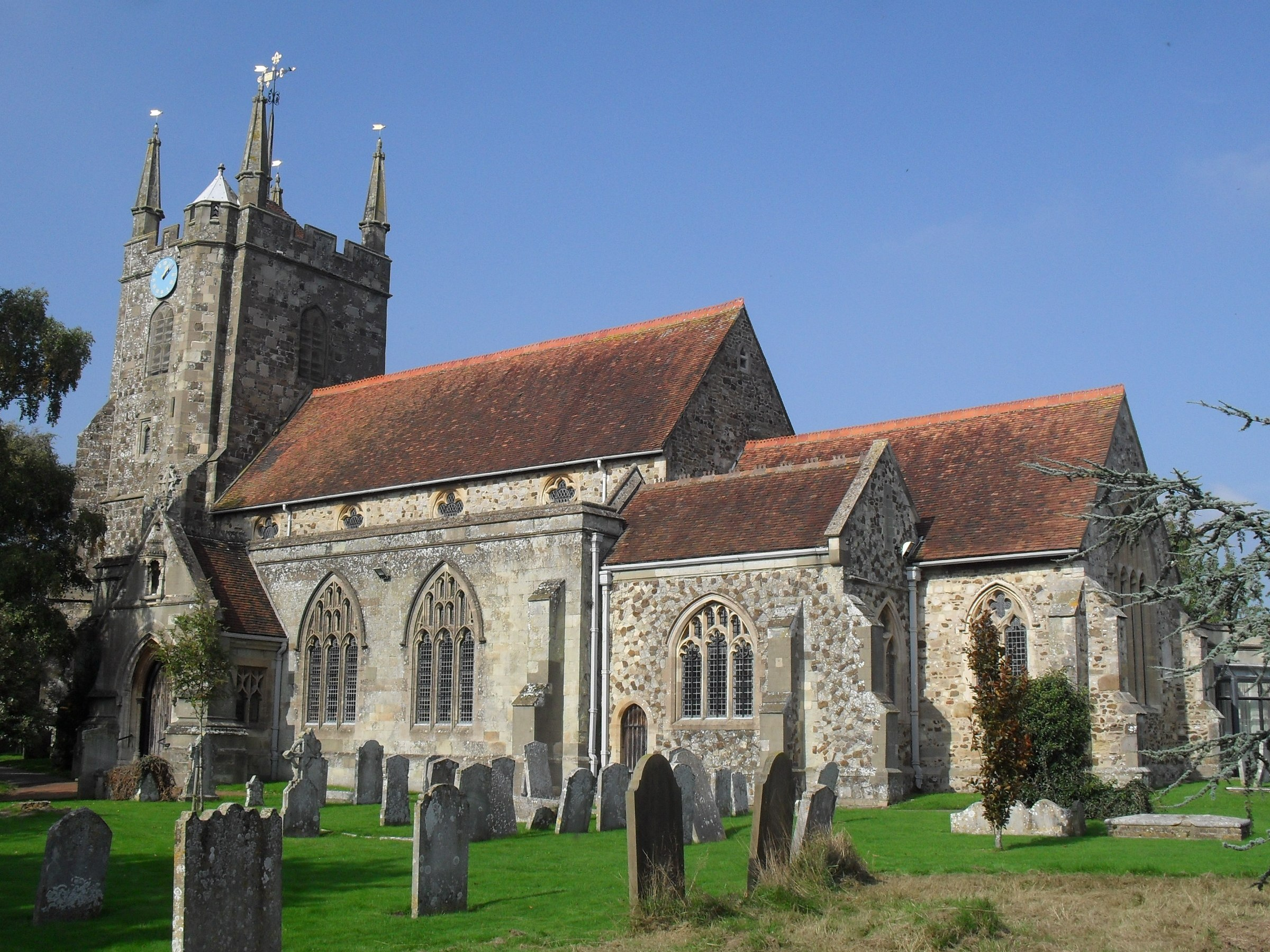
Hailsham Parish Church (formerly St Mary's Church), Hailsham, East Sussex

- Hailsham was an ancient British settlement that existed before the Romans invaded Kent and Sussex in 43 AD.
- The Anglo Saxons invaded Sussex in the year 477 AD.
- 1154 to 1189: Sir Richard Covert of Bradbridge was Lord of the "Manor of Haylesham".
- 1228: Advowson of "Haylesham Church" granted to Michelham Priory.
- 1234: Salt pan workings extracted salt from the tidal waters (hence, the areas of Saltmarsh and Marshfoot).
- 1252: Henry III granted Market Charter to the Royal favourite, Peter of Savoy.
- 1263: Gilbert, son of Gilbert Godseb drowned while bathing in "Haylesham Pond" (now known as the Common Pond.)
- 1264: Benedict the Jew of "Heylesham" was "outlawed" would have been religious persecution for clipping the King's coin.
- 1399 to 1413: Troy weights were introduced to the Market. Early consumer protections move.
- 1425 to 1450: St Mary's Church, Hailsham built (present structure).
- 1540 to 1640: Hailsham was one of the chief centres of leatherwork and tanning (using local oak bark) due to being a thriving cattle market town.
- 1542: Fleur-de-Lys Inn built in Market Street (later to be the Parish Workhouse, and now Town Council Offices).
- 1559: Uprising of the inhabitants of Hailsham who burnt part of the church.
- 1581: Manor of "Haylesham" granted to Gregory, Lord Dacre of Herstmonceux.
- 1603: James VI of Scotland declared King of England - probably from the market cross in Market Square in "Haylysham".
- 1663: First five bells cast for Hailsham Church at Bellbanks (Common Pond) by John Hodson.

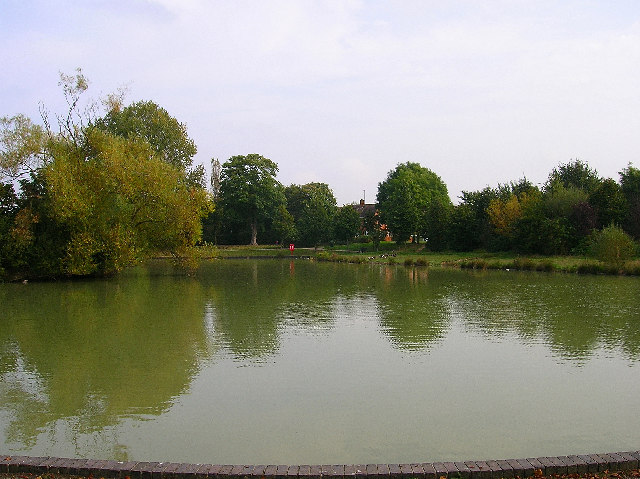
Common Pond, Hailsham

- 1708: Hailsham Vicarage built next to Parish Church (now known as "The Grange").
- 1800: The Stone Cross in Market Square removed as being an obstacle to carts and wagons.
- 1803: Barracks established on Hailsham Common (between Summerfields Road and London Road) to house troops for the war with France (dismantled in 1815 after success at Battle of Waterloo).
- 1803: Grenadier Inn in High Street also built to meet needs of troops.
- 1804: "Newhouse" built in George Street (later to be renamed "Cortlandt").
- 1807: Rope making started by Thomas Burfield.
- 1827: National School built in South Road, Hailsham to replace one held in the Church by churchwarden Francis Howlett.
- 1836: New "Union" Workhouse built at junction of Hellingly and Hailsham parish boundaries (serving needs of 12 parishes).
- 1849: Hailsham Station and railway service to Polegate opened.
- 1855: As a result of an Enclosure Award on Hailsham Common, the Recreation Ground in Western Road was created.
- 1862: Hailsham Infants’ School built in the High Street (at the junction with North Street).
- 1868: Market ceased to be held in High Street/Market Square - moved to new walled-in site in Market Street.
- 1878: Hailsham Board School built in Battle Road (now Hailsham Community College).

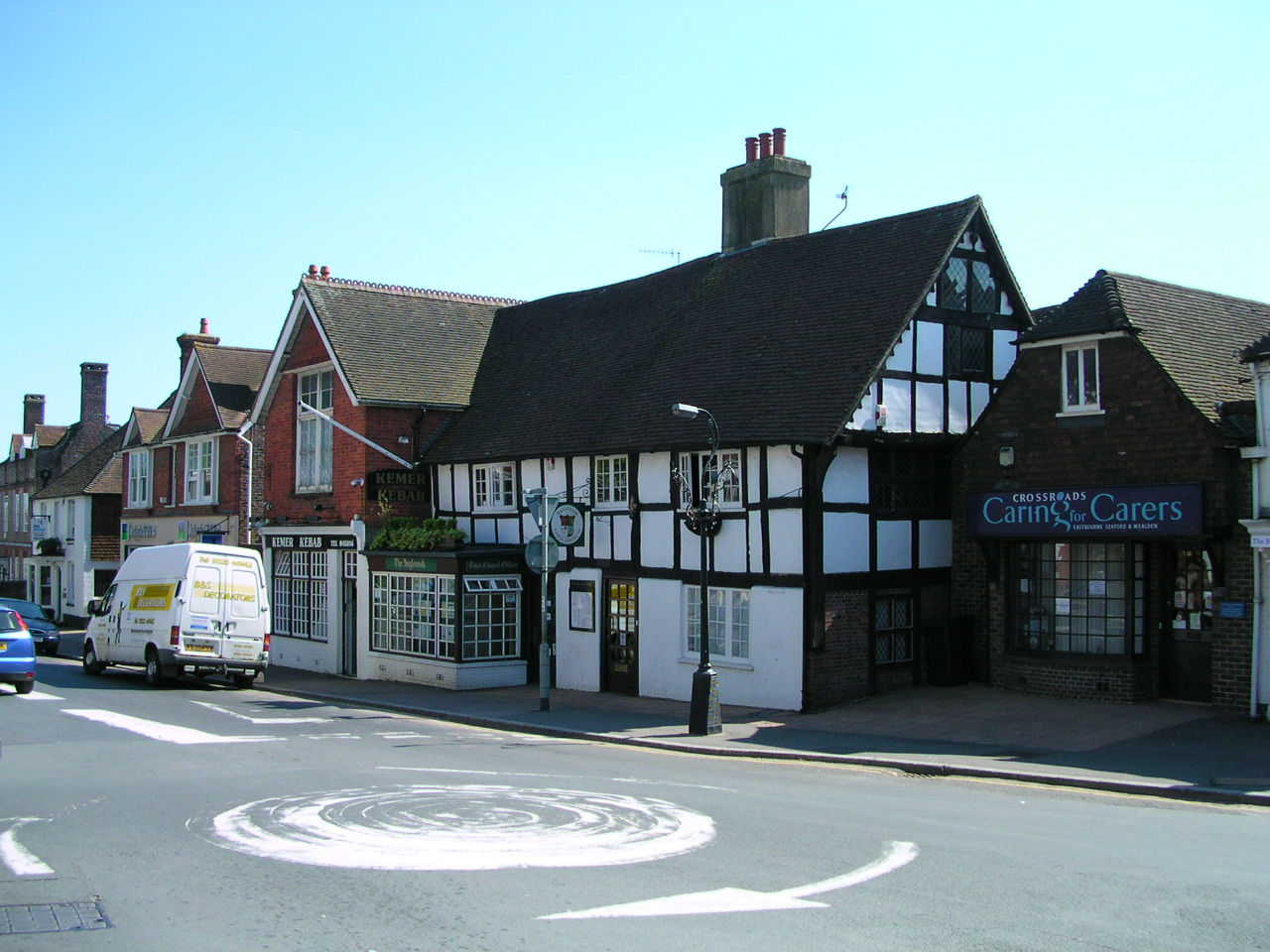
Market Square, Hailsham, East Sussex

- 1880: Railway line extended northwards to Heathfield and Tunbridge Wells.
- 1885: Hailsham Water Company started supply from springs at Magham Down.
- 1894: Austens gun shop burnt down where Victoria Gate now stands.
- 1895: First Parish Council elections.
- 1906: Hailsham Church obtained first pipe organ.
- 1907: Telephone Exchange first installed in High Street.
- 1921: Hailsham War Memorial erected.
- 1943: Bomb fell near church destroying the Auxiliary Fire Station with the loss of one life.
- 1951: Four of the Hailsham church bells were re-cast and all the bells re-hung.
- 1965: Closure of the Cuckoo Railway line north of Hailsham to passenger traffic. Passenger service from Polegate to Hailsham only survived until 1968.
- 1968: Railway station closes
- 1974: Hailsham Parish Council adopted the status of Town Council.
- 1988: Hailsham Town FC reach the last 16 of the FA Vase.
- 1988: The Quintin's Shopping Centre in North Street opened to the public, named after Quintin Hogg, Baron Hailsham of Marylebone.
- 1990: Cuckoo Trail opened to walkers, cyclists and horse riders.
- 2012: Hailsham Market saved from development and operators South East Marts purchases the freehold of the site in Market Street, ending more than 15 years of uncertainty over the market's future.

=== Hailsham Museum & Heritage Centre ===
Glimpses of the town's past are to be found in photographs and artefacts available for viewing at the Heritage Centre in Blackman's Yard, Market Street, which is run by members of the Hailsham Historical and Natural History Society. A small display is available to members of the public including period kitchen, farming and agriculture, local industry and wartime memorabilia.

== The Parish of Hailsham ==
The civic parish of Hailsham is approximately 3 miles (4.8 km) in breadth and 4 miles (6.4 km) from north to south between its extreme points. Its boundary (going in a clockwise direction) runs from its most northerly limit, near Carter's Corner Place, in a southerly direction around Magham Down, over the Herstmonceux road and crosses the low-lying farmlands, passing close to New Bridge and on across Horse Eye Level to Rickney.

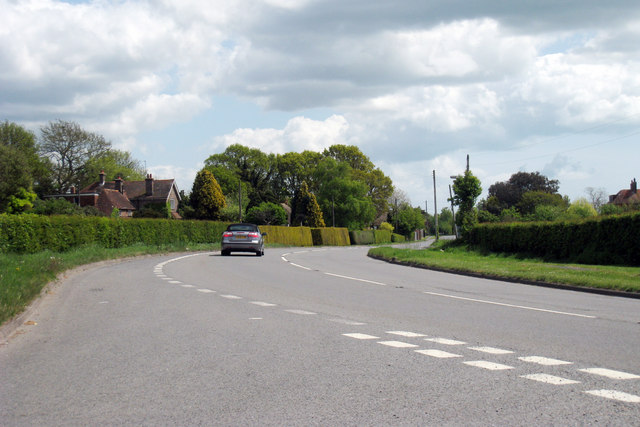
A271 from Hailsham, East Sussex

It then turns westwards taking an irregular course over the Glynleigh Level, across the Cuckoo Trail (former railway line) to the main Eastbourne road (A22), continuing northwards along this for about three-quarters of a mile until it goes west and north again to take in some of the woodlands around Cacklebury.

It runs on the west side of the A22 in a northerly direction between Hailsham and the River Cuckmere to Hempstead, where it turns east to meet the A22. It then runs northwards to the point where the Cuckmere crosses the A22 and follows the river eastwards to Horsebridge and the A271.

On an irregular course eastwards, sometimes following the A271 and sometimes to the north of it, until Amberstone where it completes its delineation by a final straight mile along the line of the road to Carter's Corner Place.

This includes the areas, which under the Wealden Parishes Order 1991, were transferred to Hailsham being a large area of Hellingly Parish (the residential areas around Anglesey Avenue, Upper Horsebridge and Lansdowne Drive) along with several smaller areas to the east, south and west (transferred from Arlington, Hellingly and Pevensey Parishes). A further area of Hellingly Parish (between the A22 and Anglesey Avenue) was transferred to Hailsham under the Wealden Parishes Order 1993.

== Geography and climate ==
In the county of East Sussex, about 6 miles (10 km) from the coast, and between the well-wooded hills of the southern Forest Ridge and the undulating chalk countryside of the South Downs, Hailsham is surrounded by "much attractive and unspoilt scenery". Hailsham is the largest settlement in the southern half of the Wealden district, and the largest inland town in East Sussex with around 8,500 homes and a population of just over 20,000.

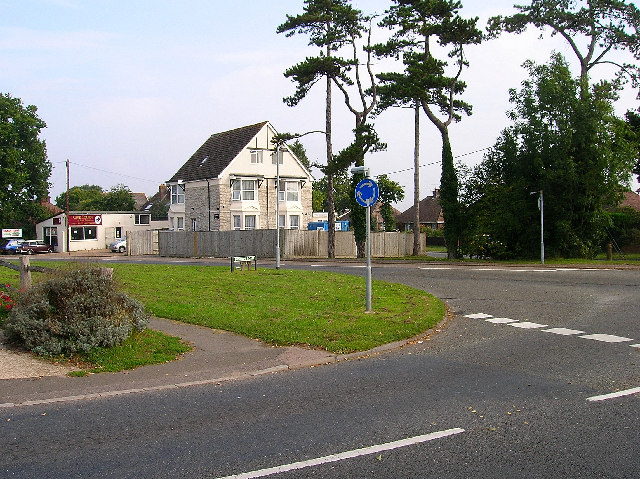
Leap Cross, Hailsham, East Sussex

=== Location and accessibility ===
Hailsham is 7 miles (11 km) north of Eastbourne; 19 miles (31 km) south of Tunbridge Wells; 14 miles (23 km) west of Hastings; and 11 miles (18 km) east of the County town of Lewes. London is some 48 miles (77 km) away.

- Road: The A22 from London to Eastbourne passes through the parish north of where it intersects main roads from Kent and West Sussex (A27), including the road through Haywards Heath and Horsham to Guildford, and links with roads from the M25 and the Midlands. Bus services link Hailsham with Lewes and Brighton, Uckfield, Polegate and Eastbourne, Battle, Bexhill and Hastings.
- Rail: The nearest rail connection to Hailsham is at Polegate. Rail services operate from Eastbourne and Hastings to London, Ashford, Tunbridge Wells, Lewes, Gatwick Airport and Brighton.
- Air: Airline services operate from Gatwick Airport and Heathrow Airport reached via the M23 and M25 motorways.

== Demography and statistics ==
=== Parish ===
- Area: Approximately 5,000 acres.
- Population: The population at the 2021 census was 23,114. The published Electoral Roll for 1999/2000 shows 14,873 recorded electors (the remainder being school children and young persons under voting age).
- Residential Rates: (Council Tax): For the year 2013-2014 this varies from Band A @ £1,111.55, through Band D @ £1,667.33, to Band H @ £3,334.66.
- Average House Price: For the year 2012, £200,463

=== Crime ===
Hailsham falls below the national average for reported robbery, burglaries and other criminal offences.

Local/regional crime figures (statistics are per 1,000 of the population within the local authority (Wealden) area (2008/09)

Offence	Locally	National average
Robbery	0.1	1.6
Burglary	5.0	11.1
Criminal damage	9.7	17.4
Drug offences	1.4	4.5
Fraud and forgery	1.7	3.1
Offences against vehicles	5.3	11.1
Sexual offences	0.5	1.0
Violence against the person	5.8	16.8
Other offences	0.5	1.3

On Saturday 18 August 2018, a unit on Diplocks Way Industrial Estate was raided by the National Crime Agency where a large number of handguns and ammunition were discovered. Three men have appeared in court and all been charged with firearms offences. More than 30 handguns and a ‘significant’ amount of ammunition was seized in what the NCA describe as a 'sophisticated gun factory'.

== Governance and administration ==
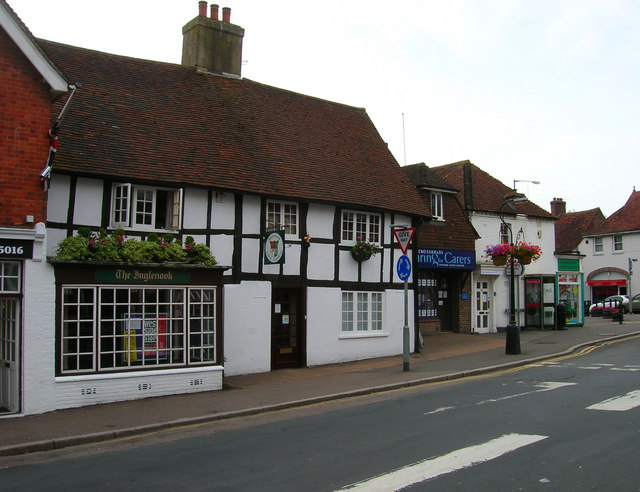
Town Council Offices (Fleur de Lys and Inglenook), Hailsham, East Sussex

In Hailsham, there are three tiers of local government which manage between them the majority of local community services and amenities.

=== Town ===
At the local level, Hailsham is represented by Hailsham Town Council. The councillors are elected from seven wards: Hailsham Central Ward (3 seats); Hailsham East Ward (3 seats); Hailsham South Ward (2 seats); Hailsham North Ward (3 seats); Hailsham West Ward (3 seats); Hailsham North West Ward (3 seats) and Magham Down Ward (1 seat).

Chris Bryant was elected as Town Mayor & Chair in May 2026 and Colin Mitchell is the current Deputy Town Mayor & Vice-Chair. Both remain in post until May 2027.

=== District ===
Hailsham is the home of Wealden District Council. District Council Elections are held every four years. Fifty five Councillors in total are elected, six of these from the three wards that make up Hailsham. The May 2011 election returned 47 Conservative, 3 Liberal Democrat, 4 Independent Democrat and 1 No party allegiance/non-group.

=== County ===
The next level of government is the East Sussex County Council with responsibility for Education, Libraries, Social Services, Civil Registration, Trading Standards and Transport. For these elections Hailsham is combined with Herstmonceux to return two seats.

=== Parliament ===
Hailsham is in the Sussex Weald parliamentary constituency. Prior to Brexit in 2020, Hailsham was part of the South East England constituency in the European Parliament. The current MP for the area is Conservative Nus Ghani, one of the Deputy Speakers of the House of Commons. Former MP's include former Minister of State for Energy Security and Net Zero, Charles Hendry (2001-2015) and Sir Geoffrey Johnson-Smith (1965-2001.)

== Economy ==
Many years ago it became the market town for the prosperous surrounding agricultural district. There are local light industrial undertakings.

=== Industry and commerce ===
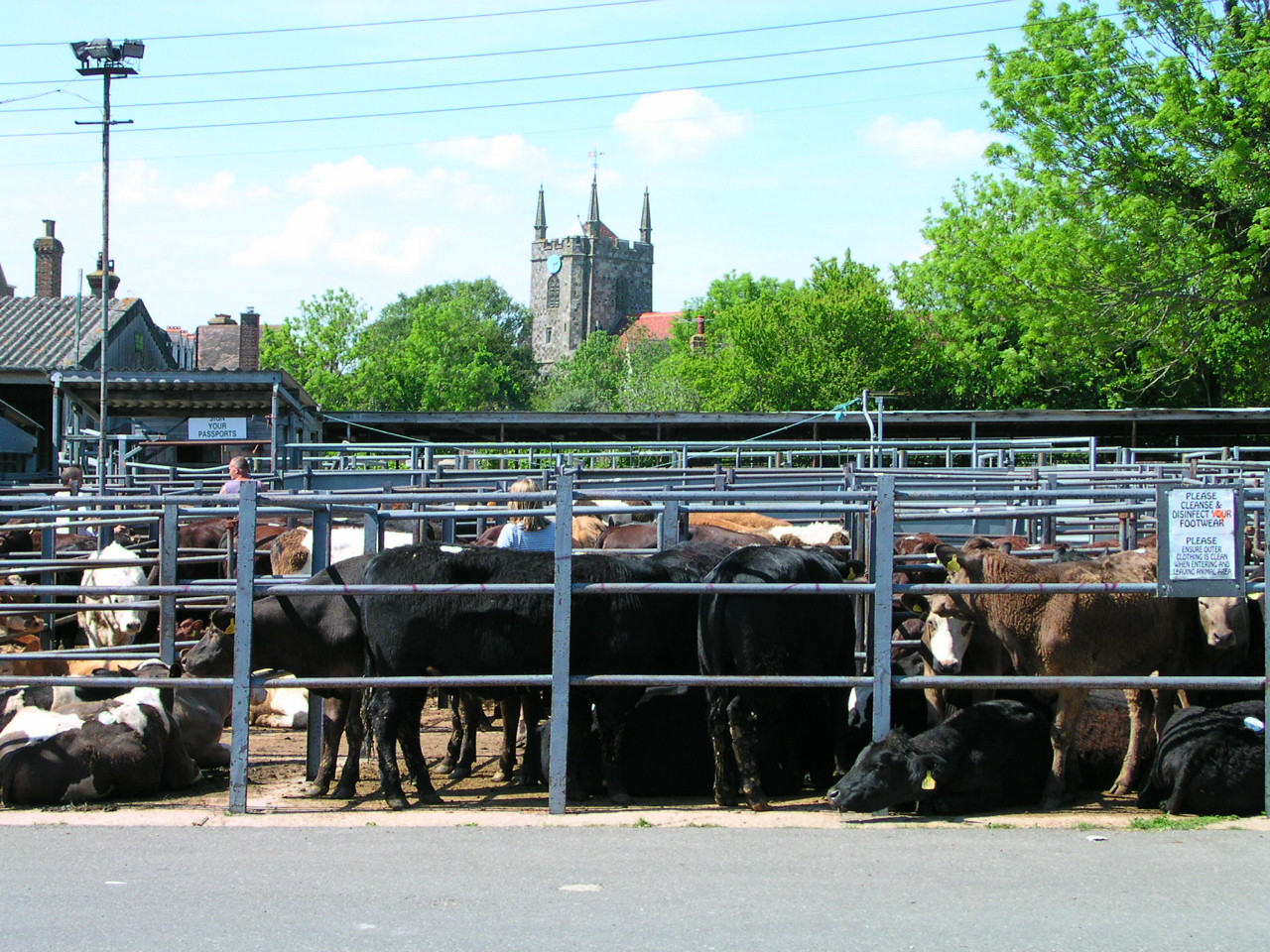
Hailsham Livestock Market

Hailsham was granted a charter to hold a market in 1252 by King Henry III. From 1997 to 2012, there was much controversy over the sale of Hailsham Cattle Market and its redevelopment into a supermarket. The land freehold was, until being sold to market operator South East Marts in January 2012, owned by supermarket chain Aldi who planned to build a supermarket on the site, although the amended planning application was rejected by Wealden District Council in November 2007. Should the market have closed as a result of development, the nearest alternatives would have been in Ashford, Kent or Salisbury, Wiltshire. Local MP Charles Hendry, the National Farmers Union among others spoke out against closure. and the Public Inquiry lodged by Aldi against the District Council's decision to refuse planning permission commenced on 11 February 2009 and ended on 19 February 2009.

Hailsham's traditional industry was rope making, which included supplying ropes for public hanging to Great Britain and the Colonies. Currently, light industry survives in two large industrial estates to the west of the town, located in Diplocks Way and Station Road, and several smaller ones including those situated in Hackhurst Lane (Lower Dicker) and north of Old Swan Lane, all of which provide a source of employment for local residents.

=== Shopping and retail ===
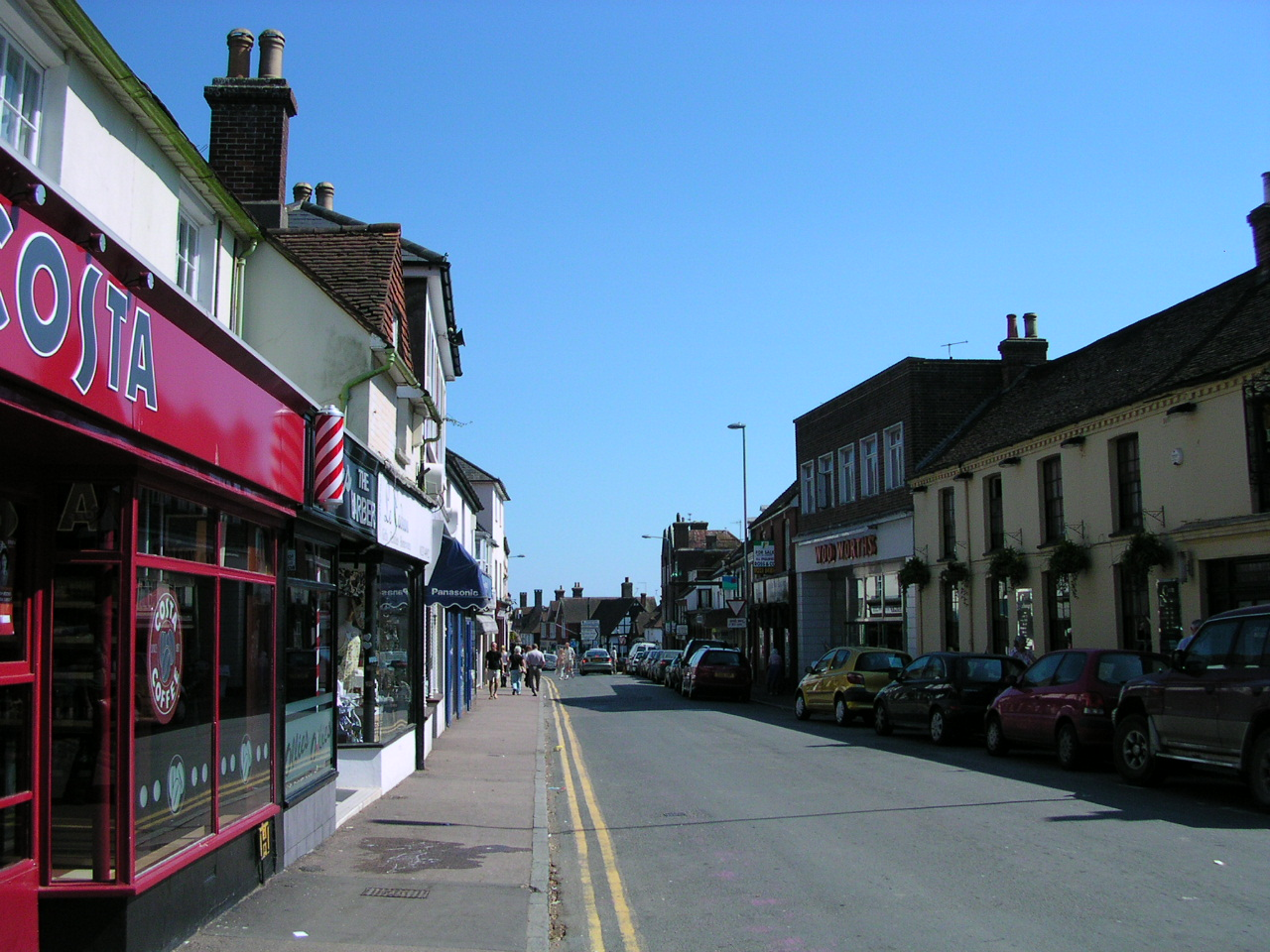
Hailsham High Street

Hailsham has a variety of local and national shops, restaurants and several supermarkets. The main shopping area has developed along the High Street and George Street. A parade of units at St Mary's Walk made a contribution to retail facilities in Hailsham.

The Quintins development, near the Vicarage Field precinct, was opened in the late 1980s, creating a focus for shopping in Hailsham. The shopping centre was named after Quintin Hogg, Baron Hailsham of St Marylebone. At the heart of the centre was the Co-operative (supermarket) until its closure on 15 July 2011 following which it was replaced by an ASDA supermarket. There is a Waitrose supermarket nearby in Vicarage Field and in North Street there is a Tesco supermarket which opened on 3 November 2008. Plans to redevelop the Quintins Centre car park to include provision a new large food store, additional units to the North Street frontage and a new car park deck were submitted for public consultation but this development has not taken place.

=== Hailsham Forward ===
Following a government-commissioned report compiled by Mary Portas, Hailsham Town Council and the local Chamber of Commerce took the decision in September 2012 to form a Town Team (Hailsham Forward), which was set up to take a closer look at ways to revitalise the town's High Street and surrounding urban environment, increase footfall and spend within the town.

Hailsham Forward's key actions for the next five years include a pedestrian-friendly High Street, parking time restrictions, the creation of loading bays in the town centre, traffic wardens, a review of business rates and shop rents, improvements to shop frontages and signage, and the attraction and retention of a broader diversity of retail outlets (independent national/chain) to fill empty retail units in the town centre.

=== Hailsham Street Market ===
One of the Hailsham Town Team's main initiatives since it was established in 2013 was the establishment of a regular town centre market. The market, which is based in Vicarage Field, is open between 8.30am and 1.30pm every Saturday.

=== Hailsham Farmers' Market ===
Established in 1998, Hailsham Farmers' Market operates on the second Saturday of each month in the Cattle Market, Market Street, from 9.00am to 12.30pm.

=== Chamber of Commerce ===
Hailsham & District Chamber of Commerce was formed in 1984 and exists to support and encourage growth and prosperity within the business community of Hailsham and its environs. The Chamber meets every first Thursday of the month.

== Housing and development ==
Extensive development has taken place in Hailsham since 1945 by private developers, with the northern part of the town now largely developed right up to the boundary with Hellingly. Wealden planning policies may result in further development in and around Hailsham, together with increased local infrastructure and services.

The Hailsham & Hellingly Masterplan, submitted to Wealden District Council as supplementary planning guidance in 2009, planned a holistic approach to the town's infrastructure: roads; sewerage and drainage; transport; retail; employment land; housing; healthcare; education and training; leisure, recreation and the arts. Among the Masterplan's proposals were long-term visualisations for the town's roads, including two major (new) relief roads which would make the High Street and town centre more pedestrian-friendly, a community-based diagnostic and treatment centre with GP surgeries, and a community park/complex.

Hailsham town councillors have agreed to support plans for improved infrastructure, including roads, schools and healthcare provision, in light of proposed future new housing developments and will work with Wealden District council to develop an “Area Action Plan” to ensure the required infrastructure in advance of any development.

The Hailsham Neighbourhood (Development) Plan, written and recently submitted by a group made up of members from the community and from Hailsham Town Council, proposes a number of policies relating to what infrastructure and development is needed to sustain future housing growth in Hailsham, taking into consideration local environment and sustainability, design, housing type, traffic and transport, economy, services and facilities.

== Education ==
=== Primary ===
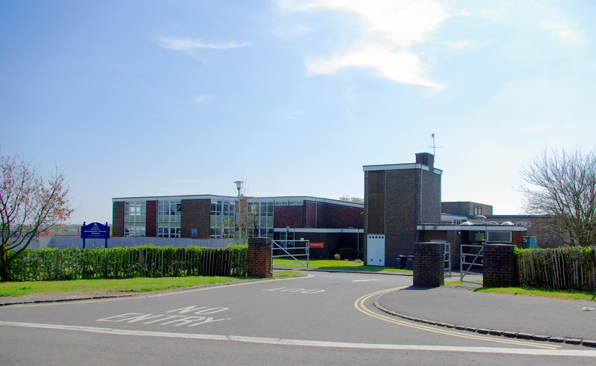
Phoenix Academy, Hailsham

Hailsham has several primary schools, including Hawkes Farm, Grovelands, Phoenix Academy (formerly Marshlands School), Burfield Academy (formerly Hailsham Academy) and White House Academy. Burfield Academy opened in September 2015, under the name of Hailsham Academy, in brand new buildings on its campus on Oaklands Way. Hailsham Academy Primary Phase (part of Hailsham Academy) opened in September 2019.

=== Secondary ===
The town has one secondary comprehensive school, Hailsham Academy, located in Battle Road, which achieved a specialist status of sports college.

The town also has an independent secondary school, Bede's School, formerly St Bede's School.

In literature, the novel Never Let Me Go uses the fictional Hailsham school as a background, although filming for the screen adaptation was done at Ham House, Surrey.

== Healthcare ==
Hailsham is served by five NHS doctors’ practices, one health centre, one physiotherapy unit and four NHS dental practices. Hospitals serving this area are located in Eastbourne, Hastings, Uckfield and Crowborough, and are managed by the East Sussex Hospitals NHS Trust.

== Transport ==
=== Road ===
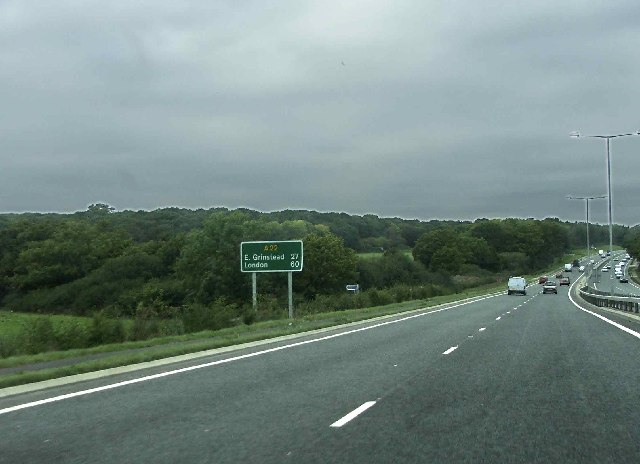
A22 near Hailsham

Hailsham is near the junction of two major roads, the A22 road to Eastbourne and the A27 South Coast Trunk Road. Hailsham is served by Brighton & Hove route 28 linking with Eastbourne, Lewes and Brighton. Stagecoach Buses on routes that serve the town, extending to Eastbourne, Bexhill and Uckfield). Cuckmere Buses, an independent charity run by volunteers, provides supplementary bus links into Hailsham to and from neighbouring villages. The Hailsham Bus Alliance was set up by Hailsham Town Council in January 2012 to drive forward improvements to the planning of bus routes and bus stop networks.

=== Railways ===
Hailsham used to have a railway station on the Cuckoo Line, running from Polegate to Tunbridge Wells. The line from Polegate was opened in May 1849 and finally closed as part of the Beeching cuts in 1968. The southern 12 miles (19 km) of disused line between Polegate and Heathfield is now a cycleway-footpath known as the Cuckoo Trail. Hailsham Railway station outlived the rest of the Cuckoo Line by three years, the section north of Hailsham closing to passenger traffic in 1965. The track was retained with a weekly freight service until April 1968, when a bridge at nearby hamlet Horsebridge was damaged by a road vehicle. With the whole line due for closure, the damaged railway infrastructure was never repaired.

The closure of the section from Polegate to Hailsham was disputed — British Railways going so far as to admit that the town was growing at the time of closure and that the town would soon outgrow other public transport. Despite this, passenger services finished on 9 September 1968 with the final train, composed of two Diesel Electric Multiple Unit (DEMU) units, leaving Hailsham station to the sound of detonators on the line and the tune of Auld Lang Syne sung by a large crowd who had gathered. After 119 years of railway operation into Hailsham, the line was gone.

== Media ==
=== Print ===
Local newspapers include the Hailsham Herald and the Sussex Express, both published by Johnston Publishing Ltd with online news content available via their SussexWorld website.

A new local monthly free newspaper, Hailsham News, was launched to the town of Hailsham and surrounding areas on 1 October 2021, delivering door to door. The newspaper features news articles in and around the town, as well as promoting local businesses, with a particular emphasis on local shopping and reducing the impact of our carbon footprint on the planet. The newspaper is also distributed to many outlets across the town and in further satellite locations.

The Hailsham Eye, published by Eye Media Group, is a complementary local publication published bi-monthly and containing home, lifestyle, leisure and local community information. Currently, it is distributed direct to homes and businesses across Hailsham and the surrounding villages as well at via collection points.

Hailsham Town Council publishes its newsletter to residents entitled 'Our Hailsham', which is issued online four times a year. The publication includes articles of interest to residents such as information on the Town Council’s activities, as well as upcoming community projects, town events and public consultations.

=== Radio ===
Hailsham has its own radio station, Hailsham FM (formerly Hailsham Festival FM), which broadcasts on a daily basis. It received a broadcasting licence in 2018. It transmits on 95.9FM from 2B St Mary’s Walk.

== Sport and recreation ==
=== Notable teams ===
- Hailsham Town Football Club, known as The Stringers (from the town's history as a rope-making centre) play in the Southern Combination Division One.

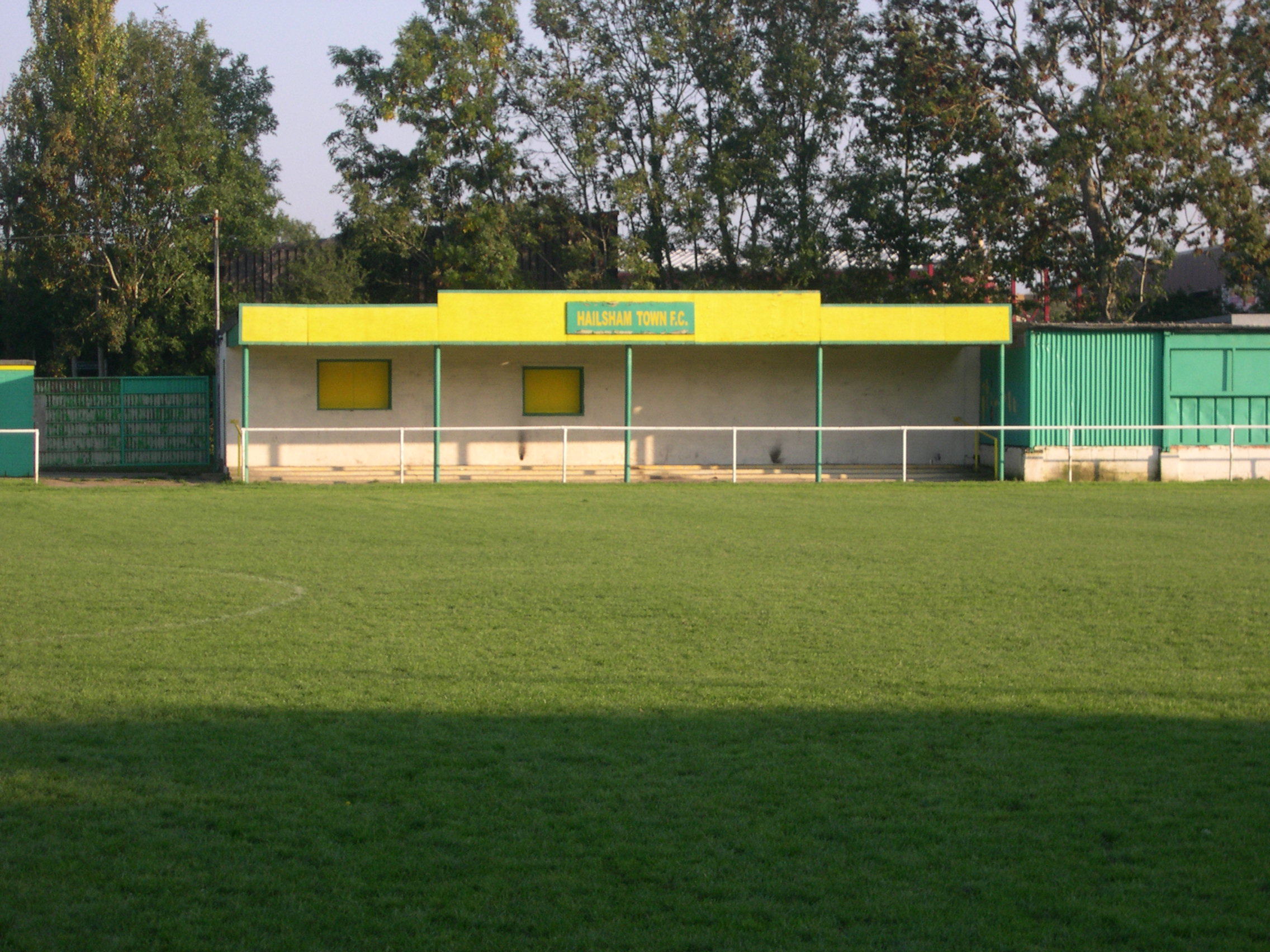
The main stand at The Beaconsfield

- Hailsham Cricket Club is one of the oldest in East Sussex having been established in 1871. The club has been playing at their ground on Western Road in Hailsham ever since, and have on a number of occasions throughout their history won championship awards. Today, the club fields four Saturday teams and a weekday twenty20 team, as well as a number of junior teams.
- Hailsham Hockey Club is a field hockey club that competes in the South East Hockey League.

=== Hailsham Active ===
Hailsham Active (formerly Hailsham & District Sports Alliance) was set up in 1995 with the objective to unite sports clubs and societies within the Hailsham district, provide support for member clubs, and to promote sport within the town as an essential activity for residents.

=== Public leisure facilities ===
- The Maurice Thornton Playing Field in the east of the town and provides additional facilities for football (junior and senior), as well as stoolball and athletics.
- The Freedom Leisure Centre recreation complex, located near the town centre, has facilities including a gym and swimming pool (with a flume and water slide). Several 10-pin bowling lanes were added in 2006. Hailsham Outdoor Bowling Club is based at the rear of the complex.
- A new, £16.7million sports centre opened in August 2026 in the parish of Hellingly, near Hailsham.

=== Leisure activities ===
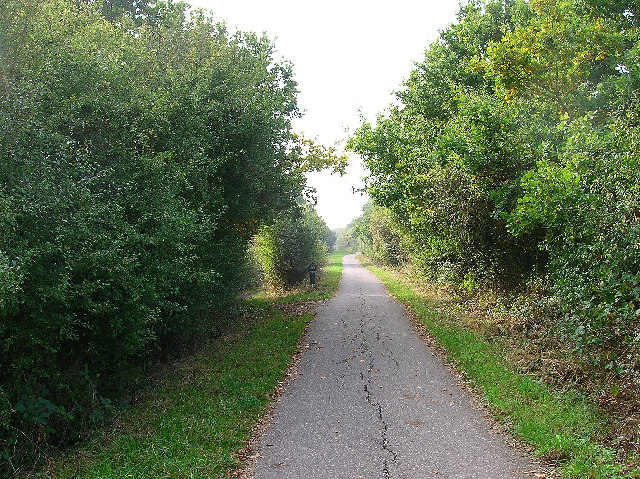
Cuckoo Trail, Hailsham

- Fishing is permitted in season at the Hailsham Country Park lake, off Gleneagles Drive. Horse riding is popular in Hailsham and there are several livery stables in the area.
- For walkers and ramblers, there are numerous footpaths, woodlands, riverside and field walks in the Hailsham district. Information on suitable routes may be obtained from the Hailsham Town Council and Wealden District Council offices. There is an active branch of Ramblers (formerly known as the Ramblers' Association) in Hailsham, which organises a weekly series of walks.
- The local authorities promote cycling, and there is opportunity for safe cycling along the Cuckoo Trail, which runs through Hailsham and connects to Tunbridge Wells, Heathfield and Polegate.

=== Additional sports facilities ===
As part of the planning requirements for the Welbury and Woodholm Farm development, an additional community sports hall has been constructed in north Hailsham. The James West Community Centre, owned and operated by Hailsham Town Council, was named after the founder and Chairman of the Hailsham & District Sports Alliance who died in November 2016.

== Entertainment and culture ==
Hailsham is the home of Wealden Brass, a brass band which rehearses at Union Corner Hall. The band was formed in February 1979 and held its first practice in the Church at Vines Cross on 6 March 1979. The Hailsham Choral Society, founded in 1961, performs several concerts in Hailsham and neighbouring towns throughout the year.

Hailsham is also home to the annual Hailsham Festival, described as a celebration of talent, creativity and imagination centred in Hailsham and its surrounding area. Hailsham Festival takes place over two or three weeks in different locations at the end of the summer.

Another event in the town's calendar is its celebration of Guy Fawkes Night, held in October. The average attendance of 3,000+ people descend upon the town centre to witness the event, organised by the Hailsham Bonfire Society. Additional town festivities include annual market events and various Christmas markets.

=== Hailsham Pavilion ===
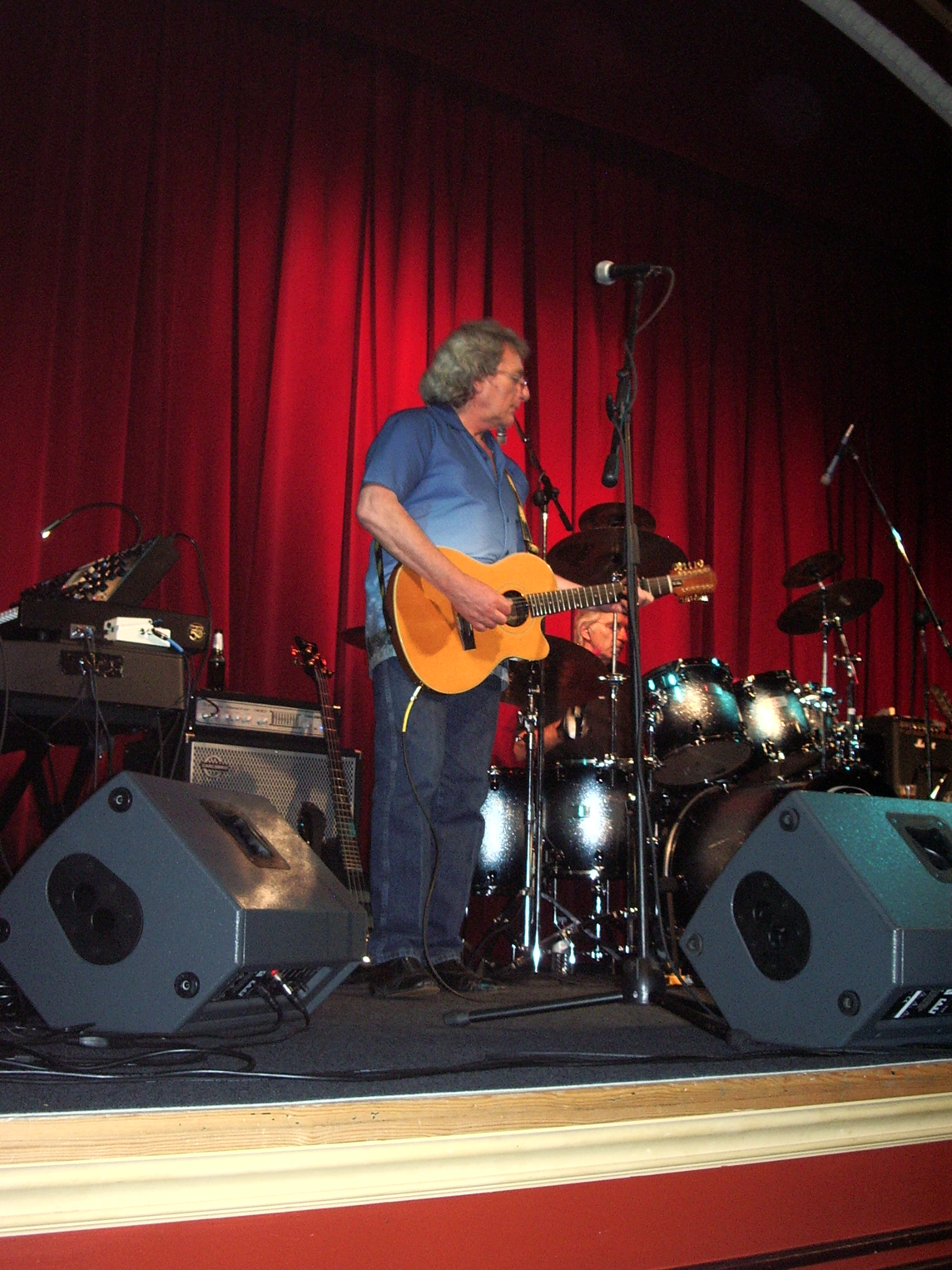
Live acts at the Hailsham Pavilion Theatre

Hailsham Pavilion is a Grade II listed cinema and concert hall built in 1921. After remaining empty, it was refurbished in 1993 and reopened in 2000. Hailsham Pavilion was originally opened as a cinema on 28 November 1921 by local Justice A. K. Burtenshaw JP, with The Kid starring and directed by Charlie Chaplin as the first picture.

Following many years of service, Hailsham Pavilion closed as a cinema in 1965. It served as a bingo hall until 1987, before being purchased by Wealden District Council using a Compulsory Purchase Order, after its owners fell into receivership. By 1999, the Hailsham Old Pavilion Society (H.O.P.S.) had raised enough money to restore the old cinema and signed a 31-year lease at a peppercorn rent. In 2012 the film The Moo Man had its first ever screening at the Pavilion.

=== Live Entertainment ===
Hailsham Live, the first live music and family entertainment event the town has seen was brought to the town on 10 July 2021, the first local event since coming out of the COVID-19 pandemic lockdown. The whole-day event was originally scheduled for 8 May 2020 to coincide with the VE Day celebrations but the COVID-19 pandemic lockdowns prevented it. Hailsham Live was organised by Hailsham News.

=== Summerheath Hall ===
Summerheath Hall is a community hall. It is home to a group of amateur dramatic players, Hailsham Theatres, whose musical and drama performances have been presented since the early 1930s.

=== Gallery North ===
Hailsham has an art gallery, Gallery North in North Street. Since the Gallery North project began in November 2004, they have showcased the work of over 200 artists, organised art workshops, courses and events (including the formation and promotion of Hailsham's first Arts Festival).

Although Gallery North is supported by Wealden District Council and Hailsham Town Council, they rely on donations, grants, bursaries and sponsorship from various organisations to manage the project. They are a not-for-profit organisation run by unpaid volunteers.

== The town crest ==
The Hailsham Town Crest was designed by a parish councillor and adopted by Hailsham Town Council for use on all official documents. It was crafted by local resident P. V. Collings in the form of a shield, which was presented to the council, and now hangs in the Town Council offices at The Inglenook in Market Street.

The shield is divided into four sectors. The upper left of these shows the six gold martlets and crown of the armorial bearings of the County of East Sussex. The remaining three quadrants each depict a facet of the town's history or culture.

The upper right shows a sheaf of corn, crook and rake, to illustrate the agricultural and rural connections from which Hailsham derived its status as a market town. The lower right shows a mill, possibly the last surviving mill - Hamlin's Mill in Mill Road.

Finally, the lower left quadrant depicts a ball of twine and rope "dolly", representing Hailsham's entry into light industry, in the form of ropemaking, which supported factories and "ropewalks" within the town's boundaries.

== Sites of interest ==
=== Buildings and architecture ===
Many parts of Hailsham have been lost to redevelopment prior to preservation orders being introduced. The town retains a number of buildings which display evidence of antiquity. The houses are mainly Victorian in character with more modern residential developments around the original town centre.

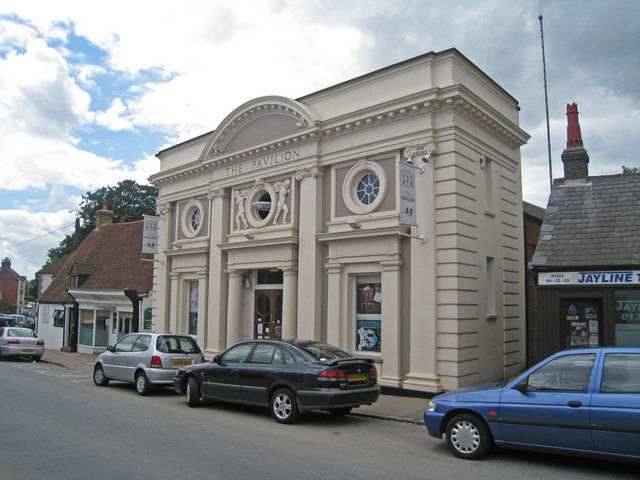
Hailsham Pavilion, George Street

- War memorial – The High Street war memorial was unveiled on 28 November 1920 by Lord Leconfield, the then Lord Lieutenant of the county. It records the loss to the community of the 86 men killed in World War I and a further 35 lost during the Second World War. The memorial comprises a wheel cross with Celtic lettering under which the names of the dead are listed on two tablets.
- St Mary's Church (now called Hailsham Parish Church) – St Mary's Church is a grade-listed building and dates back to the early 15th century, although there is evidence of a church on this site in the early 13th century. The building was substantially rebuilt in Victorian times. Five of the peal of eight bells date from 1663 and three from 1889. The present clock was installed to celebrate Queen Victoria’s Diamond Jubilee.https://sussexparishchurches.org/church/hailsham-st-mary/
- The Old Vicarage – Now "The Grange", the Old Vicarage was built 1701-1705 for the Reverend Thomas Hooper as a vicarage for the adjacent church. The architectural style of the house exemplifies what many refer to as the Mary-Anne style which reflect the Dutch domesticity of the William and Mary period, combined with the more grand and formal style of the Queen Anne period, is an early 18th-century residence and a Grade II listed building.
- Fleur de Lys and Inglenook – The "Fleur de Lys" and "Inglenook" in Market Street – one building divided in two in the late 19th century, but now reinstated as one – was originally built in the reign of Elizabeth I (1542) as part of the original hostelry of the town. Later to become the Workhouse, after which it was converted to shops and residential dwellings, it is now the Hailsham Town Council’s offices and meeting room.

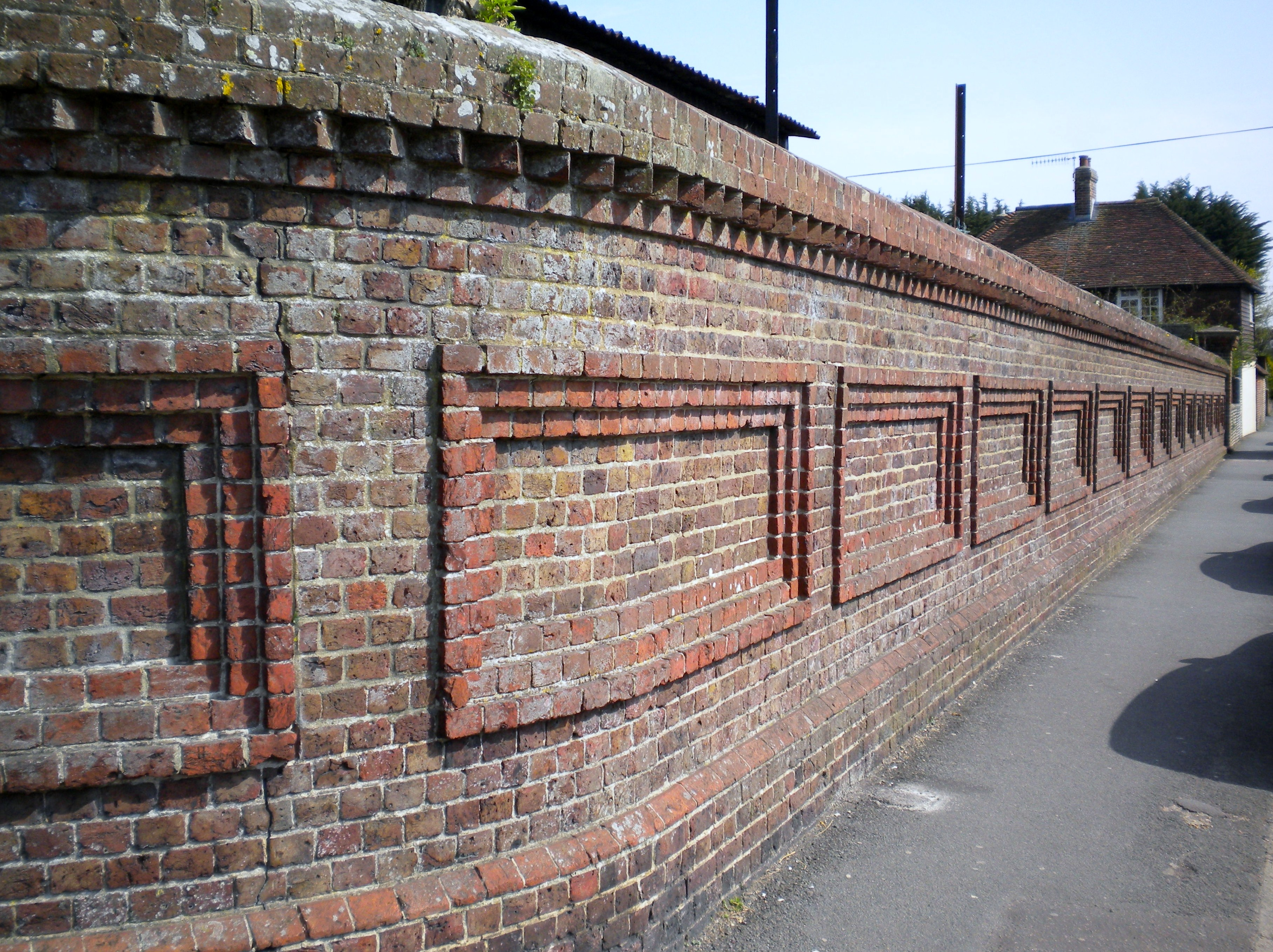
Hailsham Livestock Market

- The Grenadier – In 1803, Hailsham Barracks were built to quarter troops intended to man the Martello towers, which defended the Pevensey areas from Napoleon. The barracks were closed after the defeat of Napoleon at Waterloo in 1815.
- The Old Court House - The Old Court House was erected in 1861 consisting of a Court Room together with an office and residence for the Police Superintendent. Prior to 1861, the first Police Station was located at the top of Hailsham High Street. Offenders were placed in the stocks situated in front of the Terminus Hotel, and a gibbet was built on the corner of Summerheath Road and Western Road.
- The Stone – A Grade II listed building, "The Stone" is probably the oldest house in Hailsham and possibly named after an old boundary stone in the grounds, and originally built around 1320 in the style of the Wealden Hall houses. Featuring inglenook fireplaces, a bread oven, a priest hide, and with evidence of early sliding shuttered windows, it was once owned by Cardinal Wolsley.
- Cortlandt – Originally called "Newhouse", Cortlandt was renamed after one of its previous occupants, Philip van Courtlandt, an American who fought on the British side in the American War of Independence. The renaming was undertaken by William Strickland.

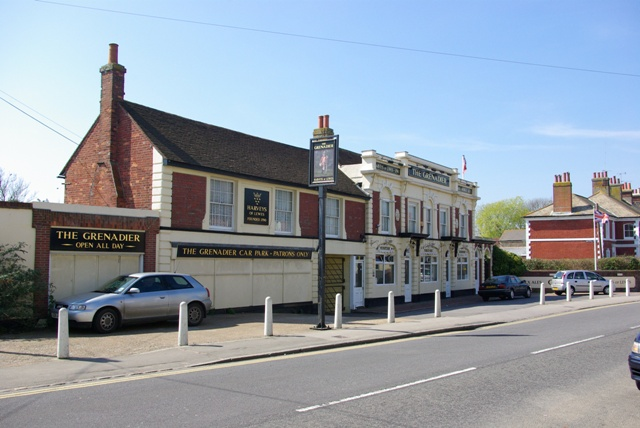
The Grenadier, High Street, Hailsham

- The Old Court House – Erected in 1861 consisting of a Court Room together with an office and residence for the Police Superintendent, The Old Court House was, prior to 1861, the first Police Station in Hailsham.
- The Old Brewery – Built in 1827 by Thomas Gooch from Norfolk, The Old Brewery was renowned for strong beers. The building was used by a succession of brewers and was, for a while, used as a Catholic place of worship.
- Hamlin's Mill – The one mill believed to be the town's last surviving one was Hamlin's Mill (where the remains of the mill's ancillary buildings can still be seen today). The mill was a smock type built in 1834, and was destroyed by fire on 17 November 1923. It was replaced by a powder mill, but by 1969, it was being used as a sack mill when it was again destroyed by fire.
- Harebeating Mill – Harebeating Mill, a post mill located at St Wilfrid's Green just off the top of Hailsham High Street, was previously known as Kenward's Mill. Only the lower floor of the mill remains and this, together with a more modern upper storey, has been converted into a private house.
- Michelham Priory – Michelham Priory at Upper Dicker in Hailsham, was founded for Augustinian Canons in 1229 in the Sussex Weald. It is surrounded by a great medieval moat, with 7 acres of lawns and gardens. Parts of the Priory buildings were destroyed at the Dissolution in 1636, and the remaining buildings formed the nucleus of a fine Tudor house built in the late 16th century. The property was owned by the Sackville family from 1603 to 1897 and was given to the Sussex Archeological Trust in 1959.

=== Parks and gardens ===
- Hailsham Country Park covers approximately 22 acres and incorporates woodland, an open field area, wildflower meadow, two ponds and a lake. A water course skirts the open field area and all-weather footpaths can be found throughout the park. The various woodland sites within the Country Park have a very good selection of tree species including birch, oak, ash, maple and wild cherry. Wildlife residing in the area includes voles, mice, lizards and weasels. The Hailsham Country Park received South & South East in Bloom Silver Awards in 2009 and 2010, in recognition of the efforts of volunteers to restore the park's wildflower meadow and the planting of additional trees in recent years.

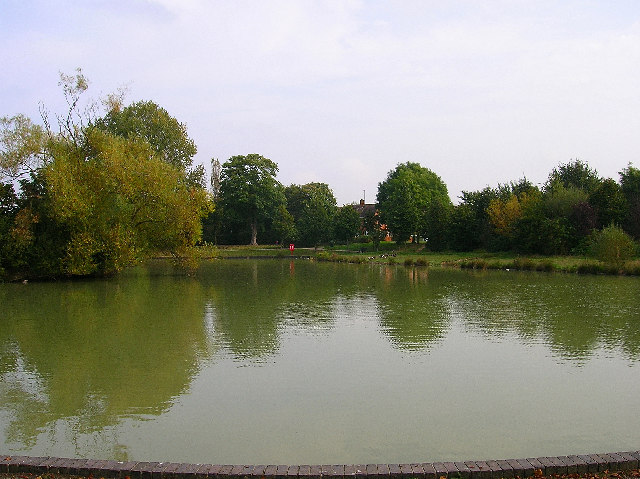
Hailsham Common Pond

- The Common Pond in Bellbanks Road has been a focal point in Hailsham for centuries and is considered to be the town's "Jewel In The Crown". The commons were largely enclosed in 1855, but the pond area was retained by the lord of the manor, Lord Sackville. It was finally bought by the Council in 1922 for £300, and became a public open space. Radical works to the 1.86-acre site began in 1996. The pond base was then excavated and surplus clay used to extend the existing central island, before the construction of a second island and a sloping marginal wetland area along and over a section of the south perimeter wall. Many thousands of carp and other fishes were removed, and not replaced.
- The Dennis King Memorial Orchard & Sensory Garden was officially opened in 2010 to help reverse the trend in the loss of traditional English orchards and create a fully accessible community garden for local residents. Advice and recommendations were received from the East Sussex Association of Blind and Partially Sighted People (ESAB) and Thrive, a national charity dedicated to enabling positive change in the lives of disabled and disadvantaged people through the use of gardening and horticulture.

=== Other sites of interest ===
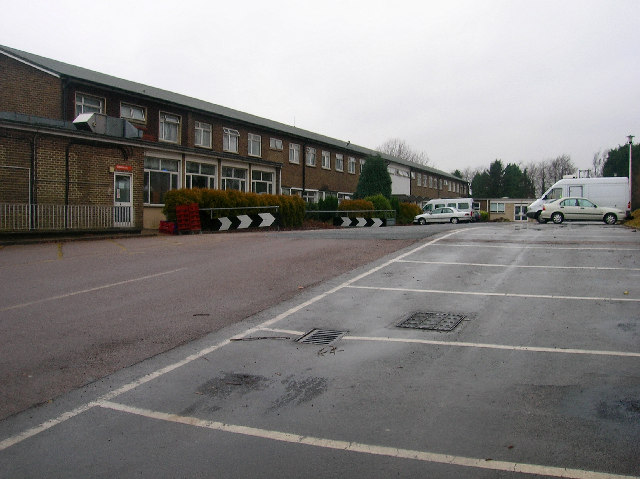
Amberstone Hospital, near Hailsham

- Burfield Park – In 1807, Thomas Burfield, a local saddle maker, founded his rope company in Hailsham. Ropes were produced for the demands of the re-emerging yachting industry, which was just recovering after World War II. Furthermore, all the official hangman's ropes used here and in the colonies were made in Hailsham. Today, Marlow Ropes has a new purpose-built factory and warehouse, and continues to manufacture ropes on the same site.
- Market Square – the site of the original market, with sellers spreading out into the adjoining roads. A market cross was erected in the square to make sure all deals were seen to be "done in the sight of the Lord". The cross was removed around 1880, to allow carts to turn the corners of the roads leading to the square.
- Amberstone Farm – On Sunday, 26 June 1814, the Emperor of Russia, the King of Prussia and their suites halted on their way to Dover at Amberstone Farm, which, at the time, was in the hands of Samuel Rickman, whose son was born soon afterwards. The child was by imperial request, named Alexander.

== Places of worship ==
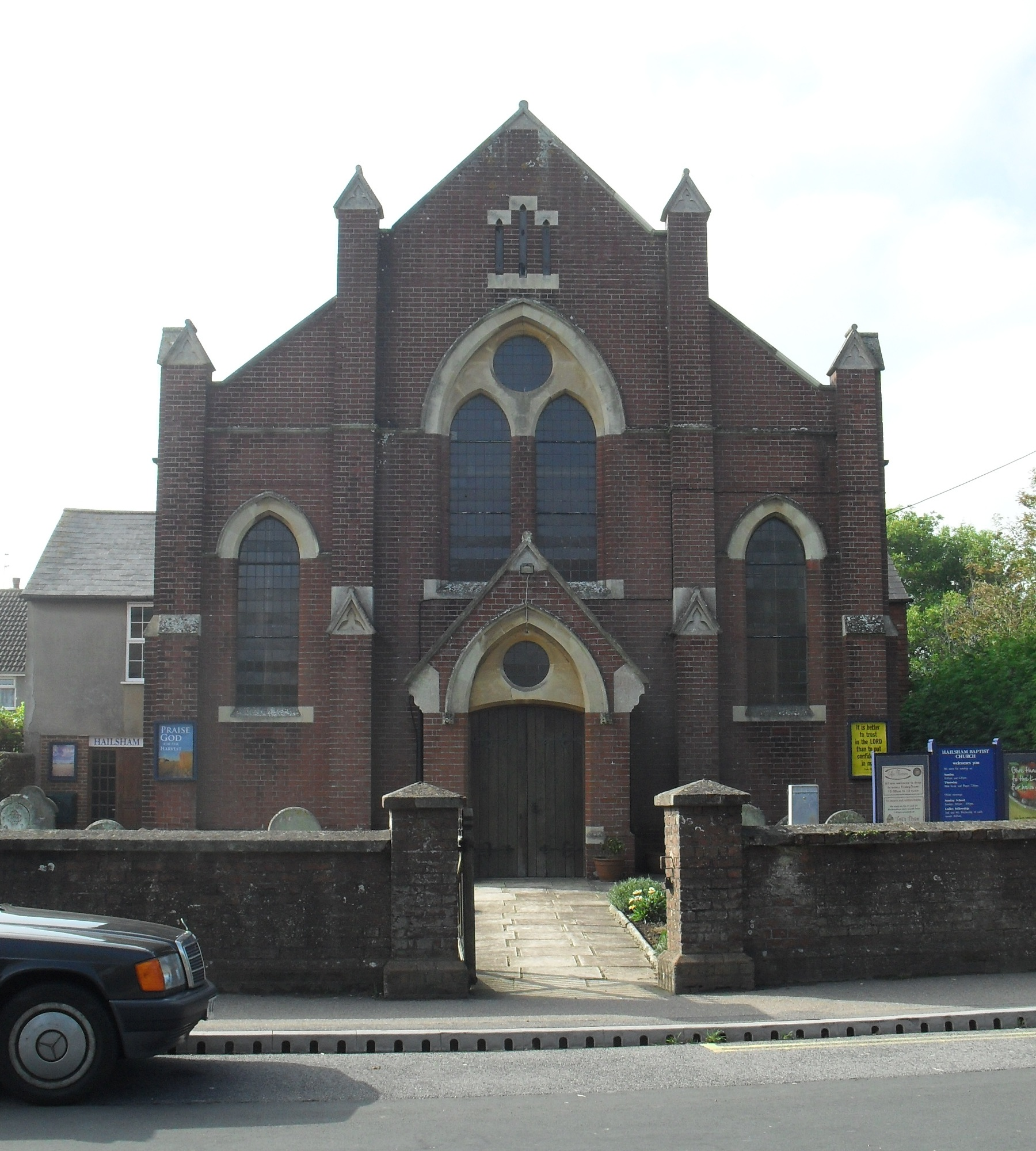
Hailsham Baptist Church

- Hailsham Parish Church (Anglican)
- Christchurch Hailsham
- Emmanuel Church (Anglican)
- Hailsham Baptist Church
- St Peter & St Paul's Church
- Hailsham Free Church (Evangelical)
- St Wilfrid's Roman Catholic Church
- Hailsham Methodist Church
- Gordon Road Evangelical Church
- Living Word Community Church (Evangelical)
- Hailsham Gospel Mission
- Primrose Hall Corinthian Church
- Kingdom Hall (Jehovah's Witnesses)
- Bartholemew's Church

== International relations ==
Hailsham is twinned with Gournay-en-Bray in the Upper Normandy region of France. Although Gournay-en-Bray has a much smaller population (c. 6,500 compared to Hailsham's c.20,500), according to Hailsham Town Council, "the features and facilities of both towns are quite similar". The Twinning Charter was signed in Hailsham in October 2000 and in Gournay-en-Bray in February 2001, and renewed in both towns on the tenth anniversary. Cultural and host family visits take place every year, in both directions.

== Notable residents ==
- Fanny Cradock (1909–1994), British writer, restaurant critic and television cook. She spent the final part of her life living in Ersham House, Hailsham.
- Peter Grant (1935–1995), British music manager and former manager of Led Zeppelin. He bought and lived on a private estate at Hellingly after retiring from the music business.
- Lord Hailsham of St Marylebone (1907–2001), British politician and 2nd Viscount Hailsham. Formerly Quintin Hogg, he lived at the seventeenth century Carter's Corner House in Hailsham.
- Ronnie Hilton (1926–2001), popular English balladeer of the 1950s, originally from Yorkshire. He died at the Ersham House Nursing Home in Hailsham.
- Anne Shelton (1923–1994), popular English vocalist of the 1940s and 1950s. She lived at Herstmonceux near Hailsham until her death in July 1994, aged 66.
- Thomas Wolsey (1473–1530), English political figure and cardinal of the Roman Catholic Church. He once lived at The Stone, Hailsham. Cardinal Wolsey was assigned the lease of the rectory of Hailsham, which included The Stone, but there is no proof that he ever lived here.
