= Peacehaven =

Town in East Sussex, England

Coordinates: 50.80°N 0.00°E

- Town and civil parish
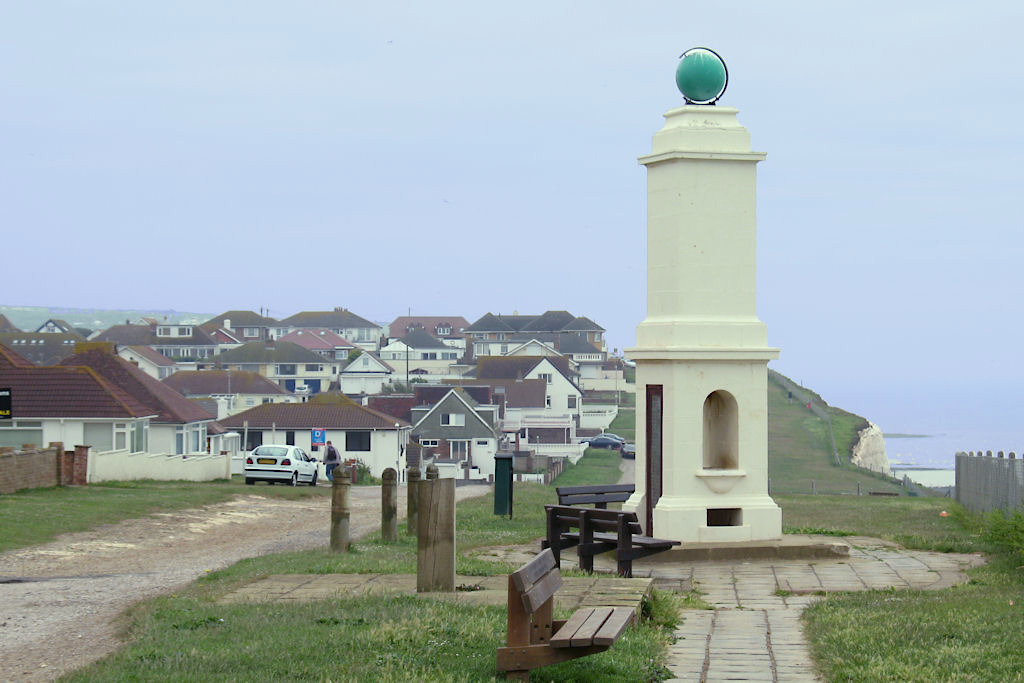
- The Meridian Monument

- Location within East Sussex
- Area: 5.2 km^{2} (2.0 sq mi)
- Population: 15,436 (2021 census)
  - Density: 6,621/sq mi (2,556/km^{2})
- OS grid reference: TQ407013
  - London: 49 miles (79 km) N
- District: Lewes
- Shire county: East Sussex
- Region: South East
- Country: England
- Sovereign state: United Kingdom
- Post town: Peacehaven
- Postcode district: BN10
- Dialling code: 01273
- Police: Sussex
- Fire: East Sussex
- Ambulance: South East Coast
- UK Parliament: Brighton Kemptown and Peacehaven
- Website: peacehaventowncouncil.gov.uk

Peacehaven is a town and civil parish in the Lewes district of East Sussex, England. It is above the chalk cliffs of the South Downs about 6 miles (10 km) east of Brighton city centre, on the A259 road. It is the place where the Greenwich meridian crosses the English south coast. Peacehaven is next to Telscombe Cliffs, a later western extension to Peacehaven, which is in a separate parish and has a separate town council.

== History ==
There is a Bronze Age barrow (burial mound) near the cliff top, which has been under investigation by local societies. The barrow is evidence of human occupation at Peacehaven at least 3,500 years ago. A 2007 excavation of the new Bovis Homes site west of Peacehaven Community School's playing fields unearthed evidence for a prehistoric settlement throughout the Bronze and Iron Ages.

Peacehaven was founded in 1916 by entrepreneur Charles Neville, who bought land in the parish of Piddinghoe. He founded a company to develop the site, and also eventually built the nearby town of Saltdean and parts of Rottingdean). He advertised it by setting up a competition in virtually every newspaper in England to name the development. The winners who chose the name 'New Anzac-on-Sea' (to commemorate the ANZAC's involvement in the Battle of Gallipoli) were Mr West of Ilford, Essex and Mr Kemp of Maidstone, Kent.

The Daily Express later sued Neville over the competition, holding that it was a scam, since he was offering "free" plots of land in the town as runner-up prizes but issuing them only on the payment of a conveyancing fee. The Express won the case, but the publicity brought the scheme to a large audience. The idea was then to sell plots of land cheaply for people to build on themselves.

Initially, the town was called New Anzac-on-Sea, but less than a year later, on 12 February 1917, it was renamed Peacehaven.

In 1927, the directors of Peacehaven Estates Ltd, of South Coast Road, Peacehaven, and 7, Pall Mall, Westminster, were Lord Teynham (chairman), CW Neville (managing director), and G. Kay Green.

Although it has been claimed that the town was originally formed for retiring World War I veterans in order for them to escape and recover from the effects of the war, this is not proven. Neville's publicity promoted the town as being an idyllic setting; sea air and simple lifestyle were thought to have aided good health. The land was also cheap and, as a result, working-class families from the city started to buy plots and gradually build makeshift homes for weekends and holidays. This movement of frontier-style buildings made with whatever materials were available at the time was called the plotlands movement. Inhabitants felt a sense of freedom in living off what they needed and enjoying a simpler life away from the busy, polluted city. The plotlands provided the working class an opportunity that might not have been available otherwise.

By 1924, there were 3,000 people living in Peacehaven. Original houses were often very temporary affairs (some were old railway carriages). Others were constructed from former army huts, brought from North Camp near Seaford, a few of these still survive, having been given an outer concrete block wall (they can be identified by their oblong shape that tends to be end-on to the road). Eventually the local council invested in water and electrical services and so people started to build more substantial houses. After World War II, the local council introduced a zoning scheme in order to distinguish areas for improvement along the coast road. In 1974 the Town Centre Map and Action Plan was formed to aid development.

There are two listed farmsteads in the town: Halcombe Farm House, built in the 17th century; and Hoddern Farm House, from the 18th century. Another old building is the Shepherds Cot; now in the garden of a private house in The Compts in north Peacehaven. This flint hut was built in the 1880s to shelter shepherds in the lambing season.

In 1933 the popular singer and comedian Gracie Fields set up the Gracie Fields Children's Home and Orphanage, for children of those in the theatre profession who could not look after them. She kept this until 1967, when the home was no longer needed. This was near her own home in Telscombe, and Fields often visited, with the children all calling her 'Aunty Grace'.

== Geography ==
Peacehaven is on fairly flat coastal land, about 40 to 50 m (131 to 164 ft) above sea level. The pebble beach below the cliffs can be reached by a stairs and concrete driveway and sea walk. There is a number of green spaces along the A259 and the cliffs, one of which is called The Dell. A cinema formerly stood on this site, and now it holds events such as car boot sales, fireworks, fairgrounds, motorhome exhibitions, the Donkey Derby and an annual carnival, except in 2005 when the carnival was held on the Joff field behind the Meridian shopping centre. In the 1950s, the carnival stalls were on the then vacant land on the northwest corner of the South Coast Road (A259) and Dorothy Avenue.

Neville was influenced by the American grid system of planning. There were originally no "Streets" in Peacehaven; only "Roads" and "Avenues". With very few exceptions, "Roads" ran east to west, and "Avenues" north to south, most forming crossroads where they intersected the South Coast Road, which is now classified the A259. Apart from this road, Roderick Avenue, running roughly up the centre, was the only surfaced road, except for the area of Local Authority housing around Friars Avenue (north) in Peacehaven until the late 1950s, when the process of making-up the roads began. This started in Telscombe Cliffs and worked eastwards. As part of this, many of the Avenues had their junction with the main road blocked off to reduce the number of junctions and crossroads. The town still retains its original "grid" layout (apart from the newer development to the west called Telscombe Cliffs and above Firle Road): rectangular plots of land on both sides of the main road. Aerial photographs from the 1930s clearly show the "grid" pattern and, at that time, the scattered nature of the community.

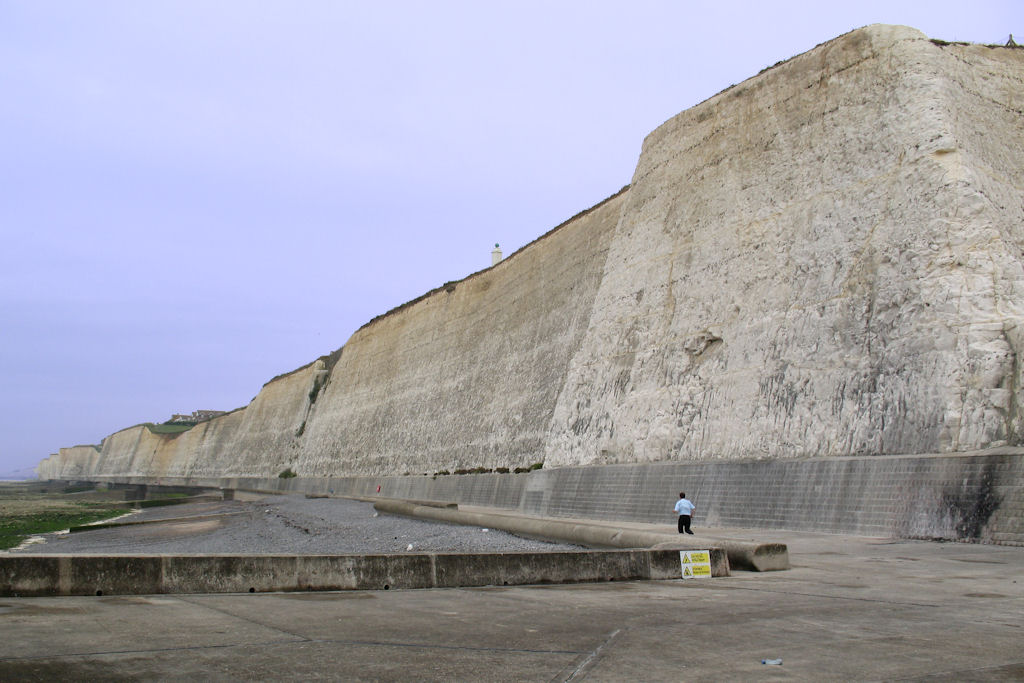
The chalk cliffs at Peacehaven

The parish includes part of the Brighton to Newhaven Cliffs Site of Special Scientific Interest. The cliffs are mainly of geological interest, containing many Santonian and Campanian fossils. The SSSI listing includes flora and fauna biological interest too.

The point where the prime meridian of the world crosses the coast is marked by a 3.5 m (11 ft) tall obelisk, commissioned by Charles Neville. It was unveiled on 10 August 1936, and has been relocated twice due to erosion of the cliffs.

== Governance ==
Peacehaven's lowest tier of government is Peacehaven Town Council who are responsible for local planning, highways and other amenities. The council consists of 17 elected councillors from three wards, North, West and East Peacehaven.

The next level of government is Lewes District Council with responsibilities for the wider ranging areas such as council tax collection, environmental health and democratic services. Peacehaven provides six councillors to the district council, representing the same three wards as the parish council.

The county council for East Sussex has responsibility for education, libraries, social services, civil registration, trading standards and transport. Elections for the county council are held every four years. Peacehaven parish is combined with the neighbouring Telscombe parish forming the Peacehaven & Telscombe Towns electoral division which elects two councillors to the council. The May 2013 election returned two UKIP councillors.

Peacehaven is in the Brighton Kemptown and Peacehaven constituency for the UK parliamentary elections. In the 2024 general election the seat was won by Chris Ward of the Labour Party.

In April 2028, the district and county councils will be replaced by a unitary system of local government. Peacehaven, Telscombe Cliffs and East Saltdean will transfer to an enlarged Brighton and Hove unitary district.

== Demographics ==
At the 2021 census, Peacehaven parish had a population of 15,436 people in 6,796 households.

Census population of Peacehaven parish
Census	Population	Female	Male	Households	Source
2001	13,217	6,864	6,353	5,829	
2011	14,067	7,248	6,819	6,249	
2021	15,436	7,979	7,457	6,796	

== Economy and retail ==
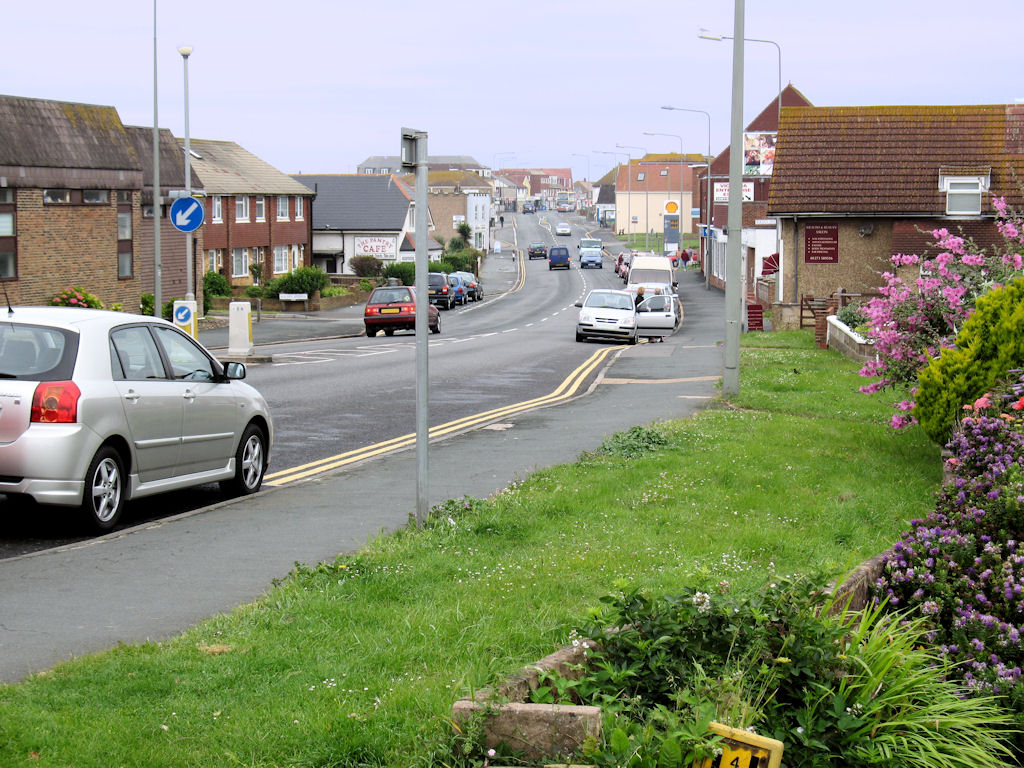
The A259 through the town

Peacehaven is twinned with the French town of Épinay-sous-Sénart and the German town of Isernhagen.

The Co-operative Meridian Shopping Centre is in the town. There is also a leisure centre, several pubs, coffee shops, cafés and restaurants throughout the town, and a holiday caravan park on the eastern boundary.

== Religious buildings ==
There are four churches in Peacehaven and one in Telscombe Cliffs. The Church of the Ascension, built by L. Keir Hett to replace Peacehaven's Church of England parish church, replaced a temporary building which had been built in 1922. The Roman Catholic Church, dedicated to the Immaculate Conception, was also founded in a temporary building in the 1920s, which survives as the church hall of the present brick church. There are also an Evangelical Free Church and a Kingdom Hall of Jehovah's Witnesses. Telscombe Cliffs United Reformed Church serves the population of both communities.

== Education ==
The town has one secondary school, Peacehaven Community School. There are also three primary schools: Peacehaven Heights Primary School, Meridian Primary School, and Telscombe Cliffs Primary School and Nursery. The library in the Meridian Centre hosts various training talks for adults and educational activities for children, as well as hosting a regular citizens' advice bureau.

== Media ==
Local news and television programmes are provided by BBC South East and ITV Meridian. Television signals are received from the Whitehawk Hill TV transmitter and the local relay transmitter in Newhaven.

Local radio stations are BBC Radio Sussex on 95.0 FM, Heart South on 96.9 FM, and Seahaven FM, a community based station which broadcasts to the town on 96.3 FM.

The town's local newspapers are the Sussex Express and The Argus (formerly the South Coast Leader).

== Sport and leisure ==
Peacehaven has a Non-League football club Peacehaven & Telscombe F.C. who play at the Sports Park. Each summer, the club hosts various football tournaments, ranging from age under 10 to under 16. There is also a small leisure centre and a bowls club and dance schools such as Harlequin and Studio 54, as well as football and martial arts clubs.

Several special interest groups operate. The Women's Institute meets regularly at the Meridian Centre along with various other community groups.

Delivered on 30 acres of land given over by Southern Water and funded by financial contributions from Southern Water and Bovis Homes, a new community led recreation destination, the Big Parks Project, was completed in 2015. Designed by architects Kaner Olette and engineers HOP & Crofton Consulting, the project includes a central activity café, children's playgrounds, new cycle paths, skate park, and sports facilities. The project has received many accolades since it was completed, including Constructing Excellence Sustainability Award – Winner 2015; Architects Journal Retrofit Award – Winner 2015; RIBA South East Award – Winner 2016; Sussex Heritage Trust Public & Community – Highly Commended 2016.

== Peacehaven in film and fiction ==
The town plays a part in Graham Greene's 1938 novel Brighton Rock.

Peacehaven was selected for the site at which a car is pushed over the cliff in the TV thriller series The Level, while earlier Tiffany Mitchell's ashes were portrayed to be cast over the cliffs, in the BBC soap EastEnders in 1999, with viewers having been told at her funeral that she had spent happy childhood holidays there.

Miodrag Kojadinović has a short story about a search for an ancestor in Peacehaven that plays with the concept of a "haven of peace", which won a prize for stories with Jewish themes and appeared in Serbian and Hungarian, both out of Novi Sad.

== Music ==
Punk band Peter and the Test Tube Babies formed in Peacehaven in 1978, and recall calling themselves the Banchood group for a short period.
