= Hailsham Academy =

Location
- Battle Road; Hailsham, East Sussex, BN27 1DT; England
- Coordinates: 50°51′59″N 0°15′21″E

Information
- Type: Academy
- Motto: "Ambitious for Excellence"
- Department for Education URN: 138472 Tables
- Ofsted: Reports
- Principal: Natalie Chamberlain
- Gender: Coeducational
- Age: 11 to 18
- Enrolment: 1600
- Colours: Yellow, Green, Red, Purple, Blue and Orange
- Website: www.hailsham-academy.org

Hailsham Academy is a coeducational all-through school and sixth form with academy status, located in Hailsham, East Sussex, England. There are currently around 1160 pupils at HA. Hailsham Academy has six buildings, a main block, science block, craft block, sixth form block and the 'F' block, which houses a range of subjects, as well as a sports hall and astro turf. The sports hall is a million pound lottery-funded building which was built in 2006.

The academy has a pathway system in which some students are able to take their GCSE exams a year early.

In June 2007 the academy was awarded the Healthy Schools Gold standard for its work on students' health and wellbeing.

The college became an academy on 1 August 2012.

Previously a secondary school, in September 2019 Hailsham Academy opened a primary school department and so is now an all-through school.

The college merged with MARK Education Trust in September 2025 to become Hailsham Academy.
