= The Turing School =

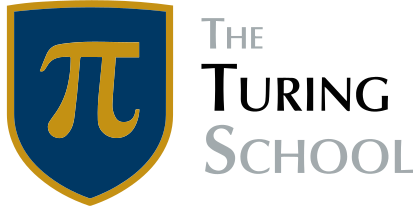

Location
- Larkspur Drive; Eastbourne, East Sussex, BN23 8EJ; England
- Coordinates: 50°48′27″N 0°17′26″E

Information
- Type: Academy
- Motto: Quod Sevisti Metes
- Established: October 1998
- Local authority: East Sussex
- Trust: Swale Academies Trust
- Department for Education URN: 148179 Tables
- Ofsted: Reports
- Head of School: Sarah Doyle
- Gender: Coeducational
- Age: 11 to 16
- Houses: Keller, Pankhurst, Brunel, Churchill
- Website: www.theturingschool.org.uk//

The Turing School is a co-educational secondary school located within the Shinewater/Langney areas of Eastbourne, East Sussex, England. It was previously called Causeway School.

The school was built in 1998 and its motto is Quod Sevisti Metes, which in English means, "That which you sow, so shall you reap".

Previously a community school administered by East Sussex County Council, in September 2020 The Turing School converted to academy status. The school is now sponsored by the Swale Academies Trust.

== School building ==
The Turing School building is a modern building featuring a central courtyard. The rest of the school is located around the central courtyard area. The school has a prominent glass bridge. The school is next to Shinewater Park.

== World Record ==
The Turing School is one of eight Eastbourne Area Secondary Schools that currently hold the Guinness World Record for the Largest Reading Lesson in Multiple Venues at 3509 participants. The event focused on reading skills using the poem "Half-caste" by local poet John Agard. The event took place in July 2014.

== Ofsted inspections ==
As Causeway School, the school's last inspection by Ofsted was in 2019, with an outcome of Requires Improvement. As of 2022, The Turing School has not yet been inspected.
