= Wealden District Council elections =

Local government elections in East Sussex, England

Wealden District Council in East Sussex, England is elected every four years. From 2003 until the election in 2019, 55 councillors were elected from 35 wards. From 2019, 45 councillors have been elected from 41 wards.

== Political control ==
Since the first election to the council in 1973 political control of the council has been held by the following parties:

| Party in control | Years |
|---|---|
| Conservative | 1973–1995 |
| No overall control | 1995–1997 |
| Conservative | 1997–2023 |
| No overall control | 2023-present |

=== Leadership ===
The leaders of the council since 2001 have been:

| Councillor | Party | From | To |
|---|---|---|---|
| Rupert Thornely-Taylor | Conservative | 18 Jul 2001 | 4 May 2003 |
| Nigel Coltman | Conservative | 21 May 2003 | 6 May 2007 |
| Pam Doodes | Conservative | 23 May 2007 | 19 May 2010 |
| Bob Standley | Conservative | 19 May 2010 | 18 May 2022 |
| Ann Newton | Conservative | 18 May 2022 | 18 May 2023 |
| James Partridge | Liberal Democrats | 24 May 2023 | 15 May 2024 |
| Rachel Millward | Green | 15 May 2024 | 14 May 2025 |
| James Partridge | Liberal Democrats | 14 May 2025 | 14 May 2026 |
| Rachel Millward | Green | 14 May 2026 | Present |

== Council elections ==
The table below shows the composition of seats held on the council directly after each election. Click on the year for full details of each election.

Composition of the council
| Year | Conservative | Liberal Democrats (Note: Includes totals for the predecessors of the Liberal Democrats, the Liberal Party and SDP (both of which participated in the Alliance).) | Green | Labour | Independents & Others | Council control after election |
|---|---|---|---|---|---|---|
Local government reorganisation; council established (56 seats)
| 1973 | 29 | 3 | – | 1 | 23 | Conservative |
| 1976 | 39 | 0 | 0 | 0 | 17 | Conservative |
| 1979 | 48 | 1 | 0 | 0 | 7 | Conservative |
New ward boundaries (58 seats)
| 1983 | 48 | 2 | 0 | 0 | 8 | Conservative |
| 1987 | 49 | 5 | 0 | 0 | 4 | Conservative |
| 1991 | 44 | 11 | 0 | 0 | 3 | Conservative |
| 1995 | 29 | 24 | 0 | 0 | 5 | No overall control |
| 1999 | 34 | 22 | 0 | 0 | 2 | Conservative |
New ward boundaries (58 seats)
| 2003 | 34 | 15 | 0 | 0 | 6 | Conservative |
New ward boundaries (58 seats)
| 2007 | 34 | 12 | 2 | 0 | 7 | Conservative |
| 2011 | 47 | 3 | 0 | 0 | 5 | Conservative |
| 2015 | 50 | 0 | 0 | 0 | 5 | Conservative |
New ward boundaries (45 seats)
| 2019 | 34 | 4 | 2 | 0 | 5 | Conservative |
| 2023 | 9 | 13 | 11 | 2 | 10 | No overall control |

== District result maps ==
2003 results map

2007 results map

2011 results map

2015 results map

2019 results map

2023 results map

== By-election results ==
By-elections occur when seats become vacant between council elections. Below is a summary of recent by-elections; full by-election results can be found by clicking on the by-election name.

| By-election | Date | Incumbent party | Winning party |
|---|---|---|---|
| Pevensey Weston | 28 November 1996 | Conservative | Conservative |
| Wadhurst | 4 September 1997 | Independent | Conservative |
| Buxted | 28 September 1997 | Conservative | Conservative |
| Pevensey Westham | 28 September 1997 | Liberal Democrats | Conservative |
| Herstmonceux | 2 April 1998 | Conservative | Conservative |
| Polegate South | 28 May 1998 | Liberal Democrats | Liberal Democrats |
| Heathfield by-election | 7 June 2001 | Conservative | Conservative |
| Uckfield by-election (2) | 29 November 2001 | Liberal Democrats | Conservative |
| Herstmonceux by-election | 4 April 2002 | Conservative | Conservative |
| Uckfield by-election | 27 June 2002 | Conservative | Liberal Democrats |
| Uckfield Ridgewood by-election | 16 September 2004 | Liberal Democrats | Liberal Democrats |
| Pevensey and Westham by-election | 29 September 2005 | Conservative | Conservative |
| Crowborough North by-election | 6 April 2006 | Conservative | Conservative |
| Uckfield New Town by-election | 29 June 2006 | Liberal Democrats | Liberal Democrats |
| Uckfield New Town by-election | 17 July 2008 | Liberal Democrats | Liberal Democrats |
| Alfriston by-election | 25 September 2008 | Conservative | Liberal Democrats |
| Heathfield North and Central by-election | 23 September 2010 | Conservative | Conservative |
| Polegate North by-election | 2 August 2012 | Liberal Democrats | Liberal Democrats |
| Heathfield North and Central by-election | 29 November 2012 | Conservative | Conservative |
| Crowborough West by-election | 22 January 2015 | Conservative | Conservative |
| Hellingly by-election | 29 October 2015 | Conservative | Liberal Democrats |
| Crowborough East by-election | 21 January 2016 | Conservative | Conservative |
| Chiddingly and East Hoathly by-election | 20 July 2017 | Conservative | Conservative |
| Hailsham North by-election | 6 May 2021 | Conservative | Liberal Democrats |
| Hailsham South by-election | 6 May 2021 | Conservative | Conservative |
| Heathfield North by-election | 6 May 2021 | Conservative | Conservative |
| Heathfield South by-election | 6 May 2021 | Conservative | Conservative |
| Hartfield by-election | 2 December 2021 | Conservative | Green |
| Hailsham South by-election | 10 February 2022 | Conservative | Liberal Democrats |
| Maresfield by-election | 22 September 2022 | Conservative | Green |
| Uckfield New Town by-election | 4 April 2024 | Independent | Independent |
| Horam and Punnetts Town by-election | 10 July 2025 | Green | Green |
