= 2011 Wealden District Council election =

2011 UK local government election

Map of the results of the 2011 Wealden council election. Conservatives in blue, independents in grey and Liberal Democrats in yellow.

The 2011 Wealden District Council election took place on 5 May 2011 to elect members of Wealden District Council in East Sussex, England. The whole council was up for election and the Conservative Party stayed in overall control of the council.

== Background ==
At the 2007 election the Conservatives retained control of Wealden council with 34 seats, compared to 12 for the Liberal Democrats, 7 independents and 2 Green party councillors. However at a by-election in September 2008 the Liberal Democrats gained a seat from the Conservatives in Alfriston, meaning that by 2011 there were 33 Conservatives and 13 Liberal Democrats, while the independents were split into 3 Independent Democrats and 4 Independents.

The Conservatives were the only party with candidates for all 55 seats being contested in 35 wards and they were guaranteed gains in Forest Row after the Green Party did not defend the seats they had won in 2007 and no other party stood in the ward. The Liberal Democrats only put up 24 candidates, down from 35 in 2007, with the party not defending 2 seats in Crowborough, where Liberal Democrats councillors Jane Clark and Martin Prestage stood down at the election. Meanwhile, Labour had 27 candidates, a substantial increase from only 3 in 2007.

== Election result ==
The Conservatives increased their majority on the council after gaining 14 seats, to have 47 of the 55 councillors. This included winning all of the seats in Uckfield, where the party gained 4 seats from the Liberal Democrats. The Conservative leader of the council, Bob Standley, described the results as a "ringing endorsement" of the policies of the Conservative council. Overall turnout at the election was 49.5%, up from 38.51% in 2007.

The Liberal Democrats lost 10 seats to only have 3 of the 13 councillors the party had held before the election. Meanwhile, neither Labour, nor any other party, managed to win any seats, with a spokesperson for Labour saying that Wealden was now "virtually a one party state".

Independents won five seats, down two, with four of those five being taken by members of the Shing family in Polegate and Willingdon, and the final seat being won by a former mayor of Crowborough, Stephen Isted, in Crowborough Jarvis Brook. This led to the Conservatives being criticised by anti-racism groups over comments on the party website saying that the Liberal Democrats had seen "the humiliation of the 'Shing' dynasty becoming the official opposition".

Wealden local election result 2011
Party	Seats	Gains	Losses	Net gain/loss	Seats %	Votes %	Votes	+/−
Conservative	47	14	0	+14	85.5	61.3	51,007	+6.7%
Independent	5	2	4	-2	9.1	11.6	9,668	-3.4%
Liberal Democrats	3	0	10	-10	5.5	13.5	11,249	-9.9%
Labour	0	0	0	0	0	10.3	8,606	+9.7%
UKIP	0	0	0	0	0	1.7	1,447	+1.6%
Green	0	0	2	-2	0	1.4	1,190	-4.6%
English Democrat	0	0	0	0	0	0.1	73	-0.2%
Motorists Equity & Unity Party	0	0	0	0	0	0.0	5	0.0%

4 Conservative candidates were unopposed at the election.

== Ward results ==
Alfriston
Party	Candidate	Votes	%	±%
Conservative	Steve Harris	606	51.2	−20.6
Liberal Democrats	Andy Watkins	577	48.8	+20.6
Majority		29	2.5	−41.2
Turnout		1,183	60.1	+11.6
Conservative gain from Liberal Democrats		Swing		

Buxted and Maresfield (2)
Party	Candidate	Votes	%	±%
Conservative	Norman Buck	1,485		
Conservative	Ken Ogden	1,295		
UKIP	Dan Docker	437		
Labour	David Neeves	394		
Turnout		3,611	51.5	+12.5
Conservative hold		Swing		
Conservative hold		Swing		

Chiddingly and East Hoathley
Party	Candidate	Votes	%	±%
Conservative	Barby Dashwood-Hall	865	67.7	+1.5
Liberal Democrats	Barbara Holbrook	229	17.9	−15.9
Labour	Jonathan Banatvala	184	14.4	N/A
Majority		638	49.8	+17.5
Turnout		1,278	51.9	+9.6
Conservative hold		Swing		

Cross-in-Hand/Five Ashes
Party	Candidate	Votes	%	±%
Conservative	Jonica Fox	unopposed		
Conservative hold		Swing		

Crowborough East (2)
Party	Candidate	Votes	%	±%
Conservative	Carol Reynolds	1,026		
Conservative	David Larkin	950		
Labour	Christopher Harris	549		
Turnout		2,525	40.3	+6.8
Conservative hold		Swing		
Conservative gain from Liberal Democrats		Swing		

Crowborough Jarvis Brook
Party	Candidate	Votes	%	±%
Independent	Stephen Isted	330	41.8	N/A
Conservative	Matthew Eade	261	33.1	−10.5
Green	Colin Stocks	100	12.7	+1.3
Labour	Roger McCarthy	98	12.4	+12.4
Majority		69	8.7	
Turnout		789	40.2	+14.9
Independent gain from Liberal Democrats		Swing		

Crowborough North (2)
Party	Candidate	Votes	%	±%
Conservative	Neil Waller	1,464		
Conservative	Mark Weaver	1,218		
Labour	Sonja Le Vay	526		
Turnout		3,208	45.6	+7.7
Conservative gain from Independent		Swing		
Conservative hold		Swing		

Crowborough St Johns
Party	Candidate	Votes	%	±%
Conservative	Jim Hollins	871	82.3	+22.9
Labour	Nicholas Levine	187	17.7	+11.7
Majority		684	64.7	+29.3
Turnout		1,058	53.9	+13.5
Conservative hold		Swing		

Crowborough West (2)
Party	Candidate	Votes	%	±%
Conservative	Diane Phillips	1,387		
Conservative	Antony Quin	1,225		
Labour	Brendan Clegg	517		
Turnout		3,129	48.9	+14.0
Conservative hold		Swing		
Conservative hold		Swing		

Danehill/Fletching/Nutley (2)
Party	Candidate	Votes	%	±%
Conservative	Roy Galley	1,593		
Conservative	Peter Roundell	1,284		
Liberal Democrats	Martha Whittle	979		
Labour	Kirsten Morris	304		
Turnout		4,160	53.7	
Conservative hold		Swing		
Conservative hold		Swing		

East Dean
Party	Candidate	Votes	%	±%
Conservative	Charles Peck	868	74.8	−6.8
Liberal Democrats	John Edrich	293	25.2	+6.8
Majority		575	49.5	−13.7
Turnout		1,161	61.7	+10.9
Conservative hold		Swing		

Forest Row (2)
Party	Candidate	Votes	%	±%
Conservative	Peter Holloway	unopposed		
Conservative	Rowena Moore	unopposed		
Conservative gain from Green		Swing		
Conservative gain from Green		Swing		

Framfield
Party	Candidate	Votes	%	±%
Conservative	Ann Newton	873	75.9	+3.3
Liberal Democrats	Linda Graham	146	12.7	−8.8
Labour	Elisabeth Rumbold	131	11.4	N/A
Majority		727	63.2	+12.2
Turnout		1,150	52.5	+7.2
Conservative hold		Swing		

Frant/Withyham
Party	Candidate	Votes	%	±%
Conservative	Johanna Howell	1,391		
Conservative	John Padfield	1,210		
Green	Keith Obbard	708		
Labour	Nicholas Le Prevost	415		
Turnout		3,724	56.4	+16.9
Conservative hold		Swing		
Conservative hold		Swing		

Hailsham Central and North (2)
Party	Candidate	Votes	%	±%
Conservative	Nicholas Collinson	957		
Conservative	Barry Marlowe	861		
Liberal Democrats	Paul Holbrook	625		
Liberal Democrats	Marc Benier	528		
Labour	Martin Corfe	345		
Turnout		3,316	42.3	+6.2
Conservative gain from Liberal Democrats		Swing		
Conservative hold		Swing		

Hailsham East
Party	Candidate	Votes	%	±%
Conservative	Stuart Towner	282	45.4	+0.1
Liberal Democrats	Brian Cock	145	23.3	−31.4
Labour	Anthony Bailey	121	19.5	N/A
English Democrat	Kevin Moore	73	11.8	N/A
Majority		137	22.1	
Turnout		621	31.5	+1.3
Conservative gain from Liberal Democrats		Swing		

Hailsham South and West (3)
Party	Candidate	Votes	%	±%
Conservative	Jo Bentley	1,252		
Conservative	Nigel Coltman	1,115		
Conservative	Chriss Triandafyllou	842		
Independent	Geoff Rowe	753		
Liberal Democrats	Ann Murrey	628		
Liberal Democrats	Eddy Powell	617		
Labour	Michelle Moore	486		
Turnout		5,693	38.0	+8.9
Conservative gain from Independent		Swing		
Conservative gain from Independent		Swing		
Conservative gain from Independent		Swing		

Hartfield
Party	Candidate	Votes	%	±%
Conservative	Chris Hardy	822	76.7	+16.1
Liberal Democrats	Valerie Banks	250	23.3	−3.7
Majority		572	53.4	+19.7
Turnout		1,072	50.0	−2.5
Conservative hold		Swing		

Heathfield East
Party	Candidate	Votes	%	±%
Conservative	Nigel McKeeman	705	70.2	
Independent	Bob Bowdler	299	29.8	
Majority		406	40.4	
Turnout		1,004	51.3	
Conservative hold		Swing		

Heathfield North and Central (3)
Party	Candidate	Votes	%	±%
Conservative	Dick Angel	1,763		
Conservative	Peter Newnham	1,660		
Conservative	Jan Dunk	1,646		
Labour	Gill Roles	741		
Turnout		5,810	43.6	+10.4
Conservative hold		Swing		
Conservative hold		Swing		
Conservative hold		Swing		

Hellingly (2)
Party	Candidate	Votes	%	±%
Liberal Democrats	David White	961		
Liberal Democrats	John Blake	954		
Conservative	Kevin Balsdon	739		
Conservative	Peter Bucklitsch	647		
Labour	Louise Orbell	268		
Turnout		3,569	43.8	+4.1
Liberal Democrats hold		Swing		
Liberal Democrats hold		Swing		

Herstmonceux
Party	Candidate	Votes	%	±%
Conservative	Andy Long	612	61.0	−8.0
Independent	Laurence Keeley	391	39.0	+8.0
Majority		221	22.0	−16.0
Turnout		1,003	46.3	+8.7
Conservative hold		Swing		

Horam
Party	Candidate	Votes	%	±%
Conservative	Susan Stedman	unopposed		
Conservative hold		Swing		

Mayfield
Party	Candidate	Votes	%	±%
Conservative	Brian Redman	867	76.5	+4.2
Labour	Patricia Robson	267	23.5	N/A
Majority		600	52.9	−5.5
Turnout		1,134	54.3	+10.6
Conservative hold		Swing		

Ninfield and Hooe with Wartling
Party	Candidate	Votes	%	±%
Conservative	Pam Doodes	764	81.6	−1.5
Labour	Ben Sturgess	172	18.4	N/A
Majority		592	63.2	−2.9
Turnout		936	48.6	+9.4
Conservative hold		Swing		

Pevensey and Westham (3)
Party	Candidate	Votes	%	±%
Conservative	Dianne Dear	1,788		
Conservative	Bill Tooley	1,660		
Conservative	Lin McKeever	1,618		
UKIP	Mike Pursglove	954		
Labour	Bob Milton	697		
Labour	Robert Slater	665		
Turnout		7,382	42.3	+10.6
Conservative hold		Swing		
Conservative hold		Swing		
Conservative hold		Swing		

Polegate North (2)
Party	Candidate	Votes	%	±%
Independent	Oi Shing	1,017		
Liberal Democrats	Roy Martin	680		
Conservative	Edward Board	544		
Independent	John Harmer	526		
Conservative	Simon Popek	402		
Liberal Democrats	Hazel Thorn	336		
Labour	Alex Mthobi	148		
Turnout		3,653	49.8	+7.0
Independent hold		Swing		
Liberal Democrats hold		Swing		

Polegate South
Party	Candidate	Votes	%	±%
Independent	Daniel Shing	493	49.4	+12.6
Liberal Democrats	Chris Berry	181	18.2	−18.7
Conservative	Wendy Alexander	152	15.2	−11.2
Independent	Timothy Voyce	110	11.0	N/A
UKIP	Bernie Goodwin	56	5.6	N/A
Motorists Equity & Unity Party	Pete Sayers	5	0.5	N/A
Majority		312	31.2	
Turnout		997	49.7	+8.0
Independent gain from Liberal Democrats		Swing		

Rotherfield
Party	Candidate	Votes	%	±%
Conservative	Huw Merriman	829	79.6	+1.9
Labour	Abbie Churton	213	20.4	N/A
Majority		616	59.1	+3.7
Turnout		1,042	53.6	+10.9
Conservative hold		Swing		

Uckfield Central
Party	Candidate	Votes	%	±%
Conservative	Claire Dowling	749	61.3	+3.3
Liberal Democrats	Paul Sparks	319	26.1	−15.9
Labour	Jason Scott-Taggart	154	12.6	+12.6
Majority		430	35.2	+19.1
Turnout		1,222	51.3	+11.0
Conservative hold		Swing		

Uckfield New Town
Party	Candidate	Votes	%	±%
Conservative	Helen Firth	452	48.4	+11.8
Liberal Democrats	Sarah Hall	273	29.2	−34.2
Labour	David Sudbery	209	22.4	N/A
Majority		179	19.2	−7.5
Turnout		934	44.8	+13.4
Conservative gain from Liberal Democrats		Swing		

Uckfield North (2)
Party	Candidate	Votes	%	±%
Conservative	Louise Eastwood	877		
Conservative	Michael Lunn	683		
Liberal Democrats	John Collins	498		
Liberal Democrats	Alan Whittaker	493		
Labour	Bruce Meredeen	268		
Turnout		2,819	38.8	+8.8
Conservative gain from Liberal Democrats		Swing		
Conservative gain from Liberal Democrats		Swing		

Uckfield Ridgewood
Party	Candidate	Votes	%	±%
Conservative	John Carvey	705	61.7	+13.3
Liberal Democrats	Dorothy Sparks	269	23.6	−28.0
Labour	Vanessa Setford-Smith	168	14.7	+14.7
Majority		436	38.1	
Turnout		1,142	48.1	+7.2
Conservative gain from Liberal Democrats		Swing		

Wadhurst (2)
Party	Candidate	Votes	%	±%
Conservative	Bob Standley	1,277		
Conservative	Graham Wells	1,229		
Green	Beth Martin	382		
Independent	Serena Gadd	307		
Liberal Democrats	Michael Cooper	206		
Labour	Felicity Harvest	204		
Labour	Christopher Morris	175		
Independent	Melissa Gates	146		
Turnout		3,926	52.4	+14.0
Conservative hold		Swing		
Conservative hold		Swing		

Willingdon (3)
Party	Candidate	Votes	%	±%
Independent	Stephen Shing	2,338		
Independent	Raymond Shing	2,151		
Conservative	Ronald Cussons	1,006		
Conservative	Douglas Murray	840		
Independent	Ray Ingram	807		
Conservative	Susan Hunt	790		
Liberal Democrats	Bonnie Beck	387		
Liberal Democrats	David Hancock	375		
Liberal Democrats	Lauren Holt	300		
Turnout		8,994	56.6	−0.5
Independent hold		Swing		
Independent hold		Swing		
Conservative hold		Swing		

== By-elections between 2011 and 2015 ==
=== Polegate North ===
A by-election was held in Polegate North on 2 August 2012 following the death of Liberal Democrat councillor Roy Martin. The seat was held for the Liberal Democrats by Don Broadbent with a majority of 227 votes over an independent candidate.

Polegate North by-election 2 August 2012
Party	Candidate	Votes	%	±%
Liberal Democrats	Don Broadbent	494	37.7	+14.3
Independent	Joseph O'Riordan	267	20.4	−14.5
Conservative	Edward Broad	263	20.0	+1.4
UKIP	Bernard Goodwin	212	16.2	+16.2
Labour	Alexius Mthobi	76	5.8	+5.8
Majority		227	17.3	
Turnout		1,312	30.7	−19.1
Liberal Democrats hold		Swing		

=== Heathfield North and Central ===
A by-election was held in Heathfield North and Central on 29 November 2012 after the death of Conservative councillor Peter Newnham. The seat was held for the Conservatives by Raymond Cade with a majority of 384 votes over the UK Independence Party.

Heathfield North and Central by-election 29 November 2012
Party	Candidate	Votes	%	±%
Conservative	Raymond Cade	685	49.1	−21.3
UKIP	Bob Bowdler	301	21.6	+21.6
Labour	Craig Austen-White	225	16.1	−13.5
Liberal Democrats	Jim Benson	184	13.2	+13.2
Majority		384	27.5	
Turnout		1,395	22.8	−20.8
Conservative hold		Swing		

=== Crowborough West ===
A by-election was held in Crowborough West on 22 January 2015 after the death of Conservative councillor Antony Quin. The seat was held for the Conservatives by Simon Staveley with a majority of 138 votes over the UK Independence Party.

Crowborough West by-election 22 January 2015
Party	Candidate	Votes	%	±%
Conservative	Jeannette Towey	465	58.7	−14.1
UKIP	Simon Staveley	327	41.3	+41.3
Majority		138	17.4	
Turnout		792	20.5	−28.4
Conservative hold		Swing		
