= Crowborough Country Park =

Nature reserve in East Sussex, England

Coordinates: 51.048°N 0.180°E

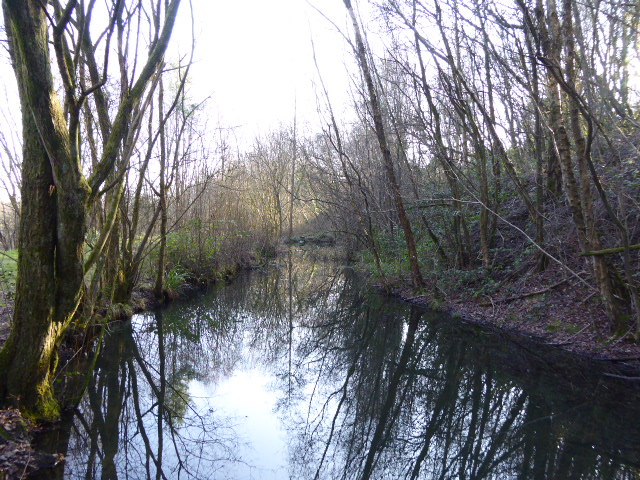
- Interactive map of Crowborough Country Park
- Type: Local Nature Reserve
- Location: Crowborough, East Sussex
- OS grid: TQ 529 299
- Area: 7.3 hectares (18 acres)
- Manager: Crowborough Town Council

The Crowborough Country Park is a 7.3-hectare (18-acre) Local Nature Reserve in Jarvis Brook, East Sussex. It is owned and managed by Crowborough Town Council.

The park has diverse habitats, including wet and dry woodland, grass and heath glades, marshes, streams, and ponds. The main stream runs through a steep rocky gorge. Flora includes the nationally rare moss Discelium nudum.

There is access at a number of points, including one with a car park on Osborne Road, as well as three foot entrances and another main entrance, all on Tollwood Road.

== Design ==
The park design includes a main stream on-site that runs through a steep rocky gorge before flowing through areas of ancient hazel and ash coppice, and there is also a carpet of bluebells in the spring.
