= Rehoboth Chapel, Jarvis Brook =

Coordinates: 51.0416°N 0.1805°E

Rehoboth Chapel
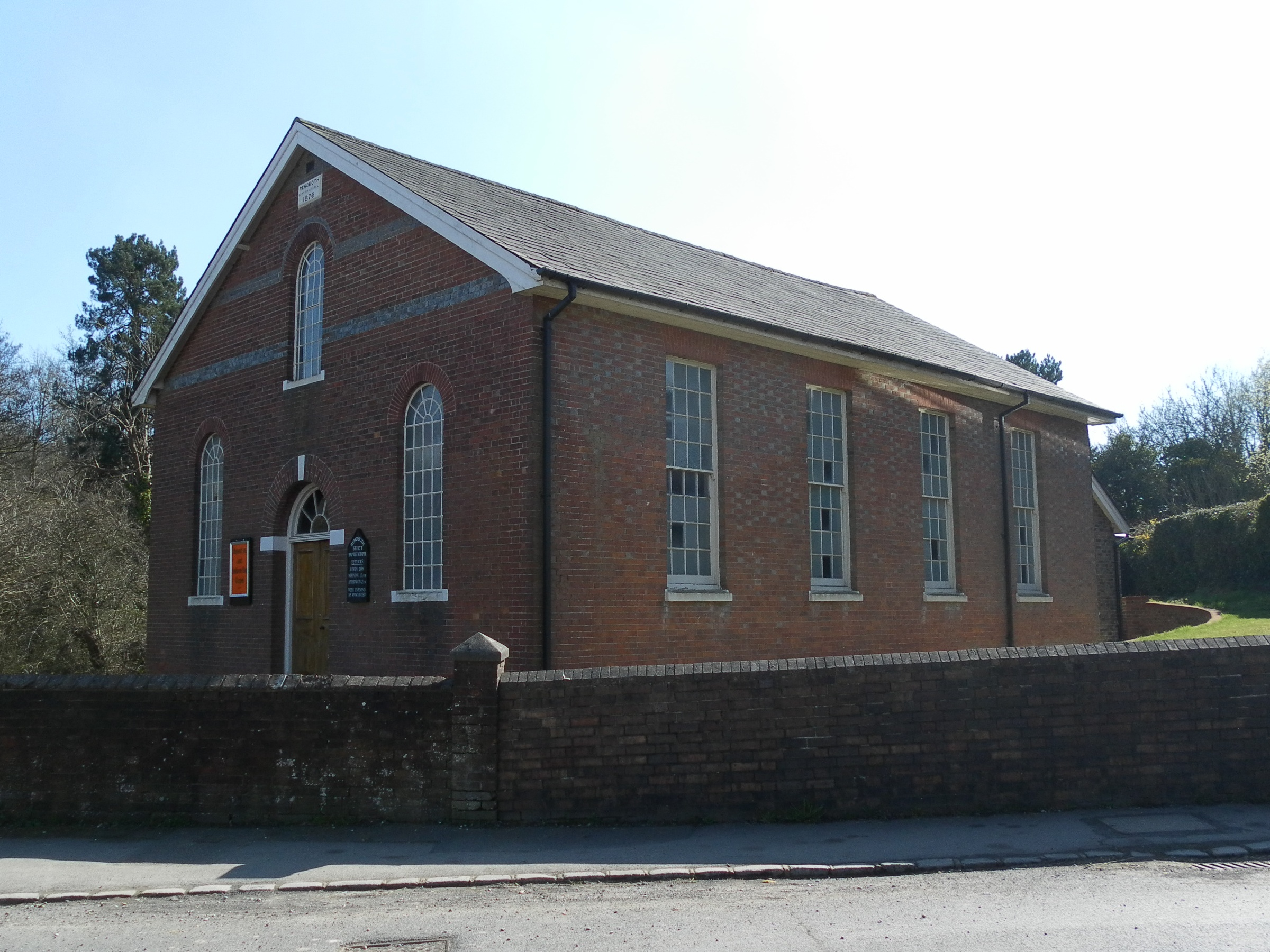
- The chapel
- Rehoboth Chapel
- Location: Jarvis Brook, East Sussex
- Country: England
- Denomination: Baptist

History
- Status: Chapel
- Founded: 1852

Architecture
- Functional status: Active
- Style: brick building
- Completed: 1876

The Rehoboth Chapel is a Strict Baptist place of worship in the village of Jarvis Brook in the English county of East Sussex.

The red- and blue-brick building dates from 1876. Its Gospel Standard Strict Baptist congregation, founded in 1852, maintains links with the Forest Fold chapel on the other side of Crowborough. Seceders from that chapel founded the Jarvis Brook cause in 1852; they met in a schoolroom at first.

The chapel is licensed for worship in accordance with the Places of Worship Registration Act 1855 and has the registration number 24990.

== See also ==
- List of current places of worship in Wealden
- List of Strict Baptist churches
