= 2003 Wealden District Council election =

2003 UK local government election

Map of the results of the 2003 Wealden council election. Conservatives in blue, Liberal Democrats in yellow and independents in grey.

An election was held on 1 May 2003 to elect members of Wealden District Council in East Sussex, England. The whole council was up for election with boundary changes since the last election in 1999 reducing the number of seats by 3. The Conservative Party stayed in overall control of the council.

== Background ==
At the last election in 1999 the Conservatives won 34 seats, compared to 22 for the Liberal Democrats and 2 independents. In November 2003 the Conservatives gained 2 seats from the Liberal Democrats in a by-election in Uckfield, but the Liberal Democrats took one seat back in the same ward in a June 2002 by-election.

The Liberal Democrats also lost seats after 2 Hailsham councillors, Nick and Madeline Ellwood, were expelled from the party, and a further 2, John Glover and Ian Haffenden, resigned from the party in protest. The 4 councillors who resigned formed a Wealden Independents party, while the leader of the Liberal Democrat group on the council, Allan Thurley, stepped down over the expulsions and was succeeded by Eddie Rice.

A total of 133 candidates stood for the 55 seats in 35 wards being contested, after boundary changes reduced the number of seats from 58. The changes increased the number of seats in Crowborough and Uckfield, while combining some of the rural seats.

== Campaign ==
A major issue at the election was council tax after it increased by 18%, 5.1% of which was due to Wealden Council. The Conservatives blamed the increase on the government providing a poor grant to the council, while the Liberal Democrats called for the council tax to be replaced by a local income tax. Another issue was housing with the Conservatives called for more land to be released for low cost housing, but the Liberal Democrats attacked the number of houses to be built, saying the infrastructure needed to be improved first. Both the Labour party and local independents also campaigned against the 1,300 houses to be built in Hailsham, with The Independents saying more houses should be built in the north of the council area.

The Conservatives said they would tackle littering and continue the household recycling scheme, while the Liberal Democrats called for policing to be improved and for the council to be modernised. Meanwhile, Labour aimed to win their first seat on the council in Uckfield and called for the council to abolish the reduction in council tax for second homes.

== Election result ==
The Conservatives stayed in control of the council with 34 seats, while the Liberal Democrats took 15 seats and independents won 6. Few seats changed parties, with the Conservatives keeping a 13-seat majority. The changes that did happen included the Liberal Democrat group leader Eddie Rice losing his seat in Rotherfield and the Liberal Democrats were also defeated in Polegate South, where Ivy Scarborough, a Residents Association candidate was successful. Independents were also successful in Crowborough and Hailsham, while Labour failed to take any seats. Overall turnout at the election was 35%, up from 33.5% in 1999.

Wealden local election result 2003
Party	Seats	Gains	Losses	Net gain/loss	Seats %	Votes %	Votes	+/−
Conservative	34			-1	61.8	49.4	31,769	
Liberal Democrats	15			-2	27.3	35.0	22,515	
Independent	6			0	10.9	9.5	6,142	
Labour	0			0	0	3.9	2,534	
Green	0			0	0	1.9	1,246	
UKIP	0			0	0	0.2	137	

3 Conservative candidates were unopposed at the election.

== Ward results ==
Alfriston
Party	Candidate	Votes	%	±%
Conservative	Keith Whitehead	673	67.3	
Liberal Democrats	Caroline Adcock	327	32.7	
Majority		346	34.6	
Turnout		1,000	49.5	

Buxted and Maresfield (2)
Party	Candidate	Votes	%	±%
Conservative	Patricia Kennedy	904		
Conservative	Norman Buck	862		
Green	Peter Selby	357		
Independent	Ken Ogden	314		
Liberal Democrats	Graham Morgan	293		
Turnout		2,730	36.2	

Chiddingly and East Hoathly
Party	Candidate	Votes	%	±%
Conservative	Sylvia Tidy	unopposed		

Cross-in-Hand/Five Ashes
Party	Candidate	Votes	%	±%
Conservative	Jonica Fox	511	69.0	
Liberal Democrats	Michael Bryant	177	23.9	
Green	Jennifer Evans	53	7.2	
Majority		334	45.1	
Turnout		741	38.2	

Crowborough East (2)
Party	Candidate	Votes	%	±%
Liberal Democrats	Carolyn Clark	555		
Liberal Democrats	Ian Mein	540		
Conservative	Anthony Edwards	422		
Conservative	Neil Waller	408		
Labour	Derek Sivers	118		
Turnout		2,043	27.5	

Crowborough Jarvis Brook
Party	Candidate	Votes	%	±%
Independent	Ian McKirgan	222	39.0	
Liberal Democrats	Peter Bucklitsch	221	38.8	
Conservative	Brian Hewitt	126	22.1	
Majority		1	0.2	
Turnout		569	28.8	

Crowborough North (2)
Party	Candidate	Votes	%	±%
Independent	Chantal Wilson	1,038		
Conservative	Hector Munro	671		
Liberal Democrats	Nigel Mahony	328		
Labour	Sonja Le Vay	201		
Independent	Michael Wallman	131		
Turnout		2,369	35.8	

Crowborough St Johns
Party	Candidate	Votes	%	±%
Conservative	Richard Broughton-Tompkins	458	75.3	
Liberal Democrats	Hilary Lyon	103	16.9	
Labour	Jean McCarthy	47	7.7	
Majority		355	58.4	
Turnout		608	32.0	

Crowborough West (2)
Party	Candidate	Votes	%	±%
Conservative	Diane Phillips	814		
Conservative	Antony Quin	812		
Liberal Democrats	Edward Willis	394		
Labour	Brendan Clegg	238		
Turnout		2,258	32.2	

Danehill/Fletching/Nutley (2)
Party	Candidate	Votes	%	±%
Conservative	Sylvia Martin	1,052		
Conservative	Bernard Brown	1,024		
Liberal Democrats	John Stevens	571		
Turnout		2,647	39.6	

East Dean
Party	Candidate	Votes	%	±%
Conservative	Brian West	612	67.8	
Liberal Democrats	Robert Hillman	290	32.2	
Majority		322	35.6	
Turnout		902	46.9	

Forest Row (2)
Party	Candidate	Votes	%	±%
Conservative	Rowena Moore	708		
Conservative	Raymond Parsons	668		
Liberal Democrats	Linda Graham	526		
Labour	Norma McNamara	270		
Turnout		2,172	33.5	

Framfield
Party	Candidate	Votes	%	±%
Conservative	John Gore	563	64.9	
Liberal Democrats	Susanna Mockridge	168	19.4	
UKIP	Keith Riddle	137	15.8	
Majority		395	45.5	
Turnout		868	42.2	

Frant/Withyham (2)
Party	Candidate	Votes	%	±%
Conservative	Christopher Abergavenny	827		
Conservative	Lynda Myers	822		
Liberal Democrats	Briony Taylor	431		
Green	Keith Obbard	404		
Labour	Michael Clare	179		
Turnout		2,663	38.6	

Hailsham Central & North (2)
Party	Candidate	Votes	%	±%
Liberal Democrats	Paul Holbrook	494		
Liberal Democrats	Laura Murphy	434		
Conservative	Richard West	425		
Conservative	John Ball	419		
Independent	John Glover	348		
Independent	Madeleine Ellwood	344		
Labour	Steven Jordan	146		
Turnout		2,610	32.1	

Hailsham East
Party	Candidate	Votes	%	±%
Conservative	Nigel Coltman	170	33.7	
Liberal Democrats	Brian Cock	128	25.3	
Labour	Dudley Rose	113	22.4	
Independent	William Crittenden	94	18.6	
Majority		42	8.4	
Turnout		505	26.6	

Hailsham South and West (3)
Party	Candidate	Votes	%	±%
Independent	Geoffrey Rowe	713		
Independent	Jonathan Ellwood	702		
Independent	Ian Haffenden	685		
Liberal Democrats	Sharon Cottingham	572		
Conservative	Sybil Bentley	567		
Liberal Democrats	Edward Powell	554		
Liberal Democrats	Gavin Blake-Coggins	551		
Conservative	Jeffery Bentley-Astor	524		
Conservative	John Kent	511		
Turnout		5,379	28.7	

Hartfield
Party	Candidate	Votes	%	±%
Conservative	Jeremy Hollins	unopposed		

Heathfield East
Party	Candidate	Votes	%	±%
Conservative	Janice Dunk	443	69.9	
Liberal Democrats	John Evans	191	30.1	
Majority		252	39.8	
Turnout		634	34.8	

Heathfield North and Central (3)
Party	Candidate	Votes	%	±%
Conservative	Richard Angel	1,082		
Conservative	Margaret Kirkpatrick	1,063		
Conservative	Veronica Oakes	996		
Liberal Democrats	David Hall	447		
Green	Timothy Rayner	432		
Turnout		4,020	28.2	

Hellingly (2)
Party	Candidate	Votes	%	±%
Liberal Democrats	John Blake	817		
Liberal Democrats	David White	732		
Conservative	Barby Dashwood-Hall	583		
Conservative	Brian Smith	528		
Turnout		2,660	36.9	

Herstmonceux
Party	Candidate	Votes	%	±%
Conservative	Andrew Long	477	63.1	
Liberal Democrats	Graham Love	279	36.9	
Majority		198	26.2	
Turnout		756	36.5	

Horam
Party	Candidate	Votes	%	±%
Conservative	Susan Stedman	381	56.9	
Liberal Democrats	Richard Benson	289	43.1	
Majority		92	13.8	
Turnout		670	33.2	

Mayfield
Party	Candidate	Votes	%	±%
Conservative	Brian Redman	459	54.3	
Liberal Democrats	Allan Thurley	387	45.7	
Majority		72	8.6	
Turnout		846	41.7	

Ninfield and Hooe with Wartling
Party	Candidate	Votes	%	±%
Conservative	Pamela Doodes	unopposed		

Pevensey and Westham (3)
Party	Candidate	Votes	%	±%
Conservative	Dianne Dear	1,245		
Conservative	John Vincent	1,233		
Conservative	Linda McKeever	1,135		
Liberal Democrats	Laura Parker	793		
Liberal Democrats	Christine Thomas	781		
Turnout		5,187	29.7	

Polegate North (2)
Party	Candidate	Votes	%	±%
Liberal Democrats	Roy Martin	888		
Liberal Democrats	Christina Berry	802		
Independent	Gerald Carter	478		
Independent	John Harmer	453		
Conservative	Anne Hampson	160		
Conservative	Michael Hampson	152		
Turnout		2,933	37.7	

Polegate South
Party	Candidate	Votes	%	±%
Independent	Ivy Scarborough	349	45.7	
Liberal Democrats	Patrick Trowell	241	31.6	
Conservative	Michael Richards	173	22.7	
Majority		108	14.1	
Turnout		763	38.7	

Rotherfield
Party	Candidate	Votes	%	±%
Conservative	David Logan	379	47.4	
Liberal Democrats	Edwin Rice	365	45.7	
Independent	David Heritage	55	6.9	
Majority		14	1.7	
Turnout		799	41.7	

Uckfield Central
Party	Candidate	Votes	%	±%
Conservative	Claire Dowling	425	52.7	
Liberal Democrats	Michael Cooper	308	38.2	
Labour	Eileen Wolley	73	9.1	
Majority		117	14.5	
Turnout		806	35.1	

Uckfield New Town
Party	Candidate	Votes	%	±%
Liberal Democrats	Ian Nottage	339	54.2	
Labour	Ian Smith	144	23.0	
Conservative	Daphne Mainprice	143	22.8	
Majority		195	31.2	
Turnout		626	31.0	

Uckfield North (2)
Party	Candidate	Votes	%	±%
Liberal Democrats	Paul Sparks	632		
Liberal Democrats	Alan Whittaker	520		
Conservative	Michael Heap	356		
Labour	Duncan Bennett	250		
Labour	Leonard Ashby	246		
Turnout		2,004	27.8	

Uckfield Ridgewood
Party	Candidate	Votes	%	±%
Liberal Democrats	Anthony Parker	483	57.2	
Conservative	Silvia Buck	310	36.7	
Labour	Jane 'Espinasse	51	6.0	
Majority		173	20.5	
Turnout		844	39.1	

Wadhurst (2)
Party	Candidate	Votes	%	±%
Conservative	Anna Monaghan	767		
Conservative	Robert Hodgson	734		
Liberal Democrats	Emma Sanderson-Nash	395		
Liberal Democrats	Rosalyn Bucklitsch	324		
Labour	Jane Zacharzewski	144		
Turnout		2,364	32.0	

Willingdon (3)
Party	Candidate	Votes	%	±%
Liberal Democrats	Stephen Shing	1,770		
Liberal Democrats	Anthony Seabrook	1,559		
Liberal Democrats	Andrew Watkins	1,516		
Conservative	David Burtenshaw	1,043		
Conservative	Guy Woodford	1,000		
Conservative	Raymond Ingram	949		
Independent	Margaret Piper	216		
Labour	Patricia Brinson	123		
Labour	Helen Sedgewick	114		
Labour	Gillian Roles	77		
Turnout		8,367	48.7	

== By-elections between 2003 and 2007 ==
=== Uckfield Ridgewood ===
A by-election was held in Uckfield Ridgewood on 16 September 2004 and was held for the Liberal Democrats by Robert Sweetland with a 185-vote majority.

Uckfield Ridgewood By-Election 16 September 2004
Party	Candidate	Votes	%	±%
Liberal Democrats	Robert Sweetland	380	60.4	+3.2
Conservative	Jacob Vince	195	31.0	−5.7
Labour	Leonard Ashby	54	8.6	+2.6
Majority		185	29.4	+8.9
Turnout		629	28.6	+8.1
Liberal Democrats hold		Swing		

=== Pevensey and Westham ===
A by-election was held in Pevensey and Westham on 29 September 2005 after the death of the previous councillor John Vincent. The seat was held for the Conservatives by Kevin Balsdon with a 760-vote majority.

Pevensey and Westham By-Election 29 September 2005
Party	Candidate	Votes	%	±%
Conservative	Kevin Balsdon	1,229	66.7	+5.6
Liberal Democrats	Christine Thomas	469	25.5	−13.4
Labour	Robert Walker	143	7.8	+7.8
Majority		760	41.2	
Turnout		1,841	25.7	−4.0
Conservative hold		Swing		

=== Crowborough North ===
A by-election was held in Crowborough North on 6 April 2006 and was held for the Conservatives by Timothy Tyler with a 279-vote majority.

Crowborough North By-Election 6 April 2006
Party	Candidate	Votes	%	±%
Conservative	Timothy Tyler	417	52.5	+22.5
Liberal Democrats	Peter Bucklitsch	138	17.4	+2.7
Independent	Paul Scott	103	13.0	−33.4
Labour	Jean McCarthy	94	11.8	+2.8
Independent	Colin Stocks	43	5.4	+5.4
Majority		279	35.1	
Turnout		795	20.1	−15.7
Conservative hold		Swing		

=== Uckfield New Town ===
A by-election was held in Uckfield New Town on 29 June 2006 after the death of the Liberal Democrat councillor Ian Nottage. The seat was held for the Liberal Democrats by Julia Hey with a 170-vote majority.

Uckfield New Town By-Election 29 June 2006
Party	Candidate	Votes	%	±%
Liberal Democrats	Julia Hey	381	57.6	+3.4
Conservative	Marion Rowland	211	31.9	+9.1
Green	Samantha Bryant	69	10.4	+10.4
Majority		170	25.7	−5.5
Turnout		661	32.5	+1.5
Liberal Democrats hold		Swing		
