= Steel Cross =

Coordinates: 51.0639°N 0.1824°E

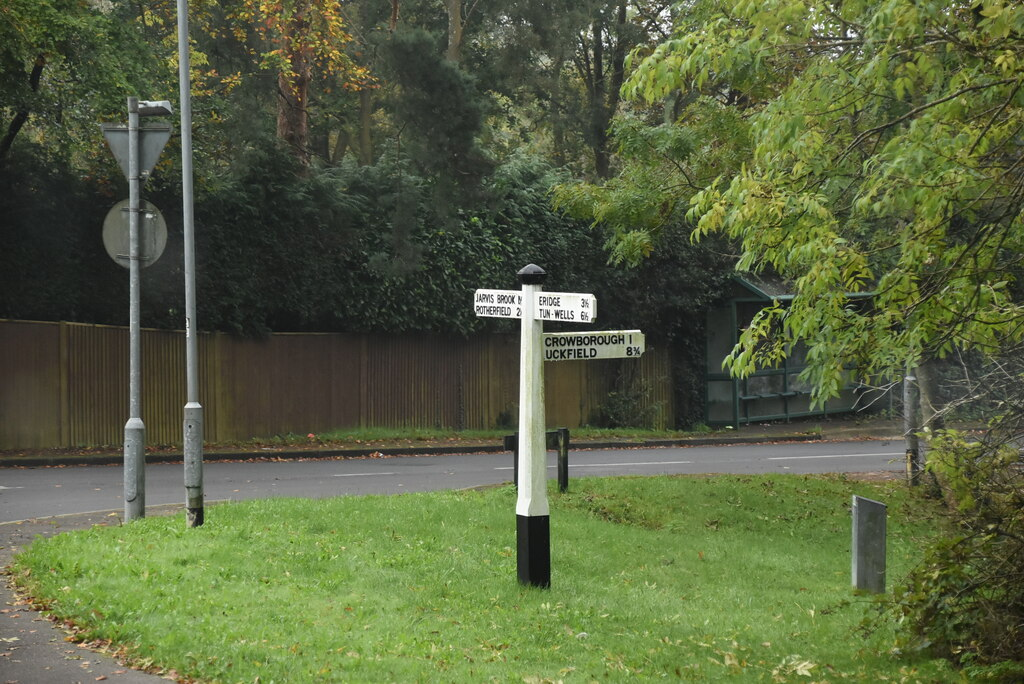
- Roundabout in the centre of the hamlet

- Location within East Sussex
- Civil parish: Crowborough
- District: Wealden
- Shire county: East Sussex
- Region: South East
- Country: England
- Sovereign state: United Kingdom
- Police: Sussex
- Fire: East Sussex
- Ambulance: South East Coast

Steel Cross is a village in the north-east of Crowborough, in the Wealden district, in the county of East Sussex, England.

== Geography ==
Steel Cross is located in the northern region of East Sussex, England. It is in the north-east of Crowborough and is south-west of Tunbridge Wells. The village is half-way in the Jarvis Brook ward.

== Transport ==
The main road in Steel Cross is the A26 which runs north-east to Maidstone and south to Newhaven. The 29 Regency Route bus runs through the centre of the village.

== Sport and leisure ==
Steel Cross is home to Crowborough Rugby Football Club and a 9 hole Par 35 Golf Course.

== History ==
The earliest documented representations of Steel Cross are in 1724 as a part of the 1 inch to 1 mile map of Sussex produced in 1724 by Richard Budgen. Historical maps show the road network and scattered buildings that formed the centre of the hamlet, reflecting its origins as an agricultural locality within the High Weald landscape.

Throughout the 20th century, Steel Cross remained a small, predominantly residential and agricultural community within the Crowborough Civil parish. Its location along the A26 meant that it served local travellers and residents, with amenities such as a village post office historically serving the immediate area.

There used to be a school named "Steel Cross National School" in Steel Cross which was built in 1865 opened in 1866 and closed just before the 2nd World War. The school was funded by the Goldsmith family and the average attendance was 100 children. On the gable of the building there is a Goldmith's emblem.

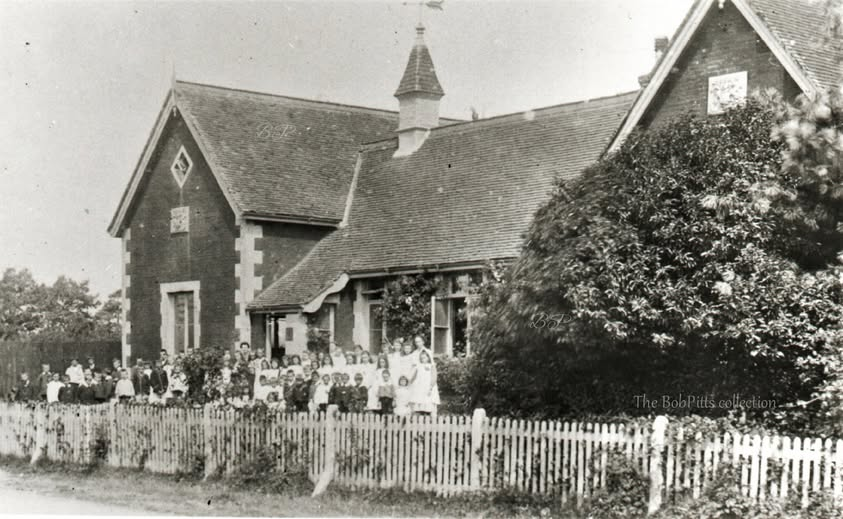
Steel Cross National School, around 1905
