= St John's, Crowborough =

Village in East Sussex, England

Coordinates: 51.0653°N 0.1463°E

St John's
- Village
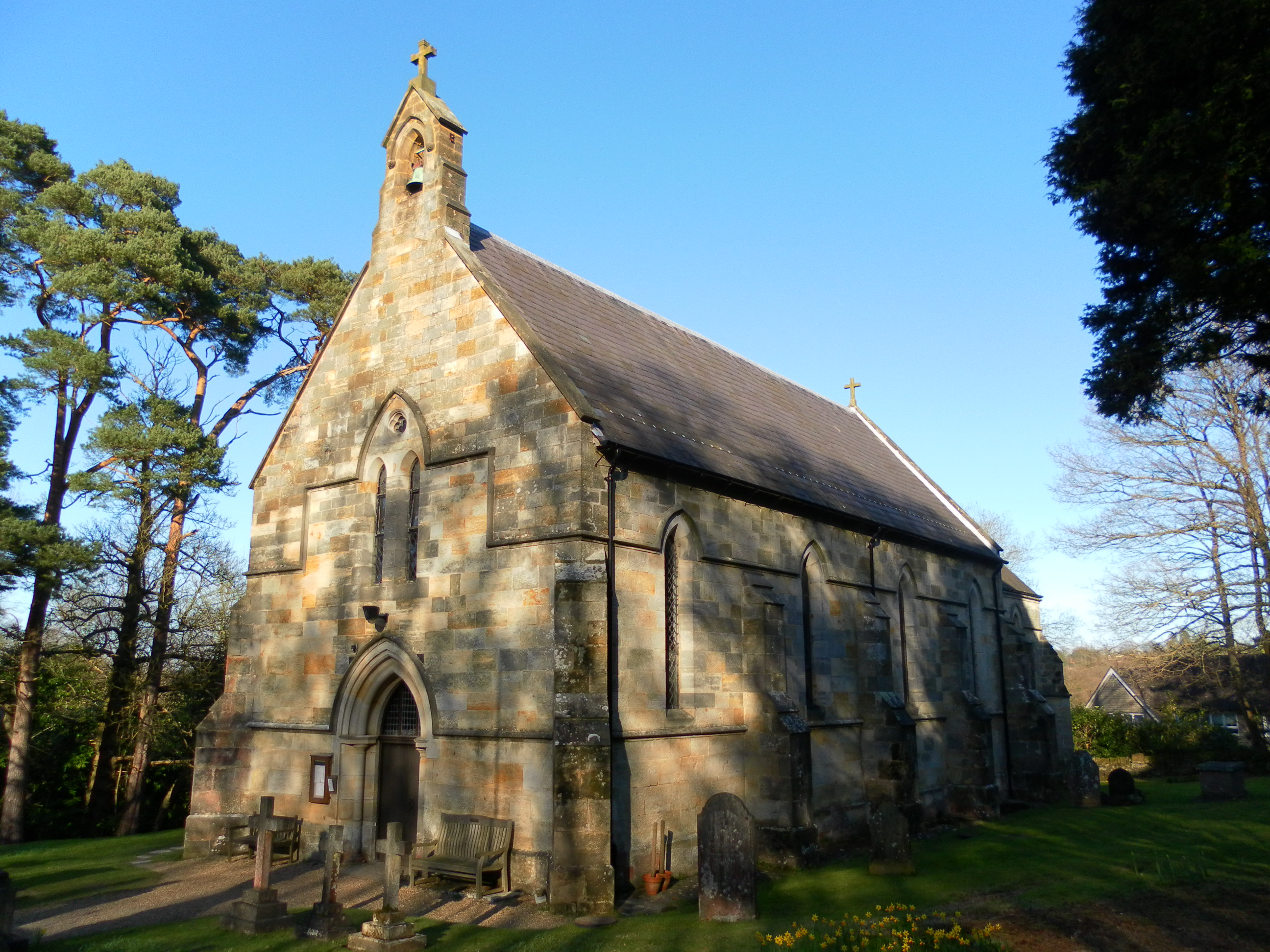
- St John the Evangelist's Church

- Location within East Sussex
- Area: 3.4 km^{2} (1.3 sq mi)
- Population: 3,135
  - Density: 3,135/sq mi (1,210/km^{2})
- OS grid reference: TQ504317
- Civil parish: Crowborough
- District: Wealden
- Shire county: East Sussex
- Region: South East
- Country: England
- Sovereign state: United Kingdom
- Post town: CROWBOROUGH
- Postcode district: TN6
- Dialling code: 01892
- Police: Sussex
- Fire: East Sussex
- Ambulance: South East Coast
- UK Parliament: Sussex Weald

St John's is a village in the north of Crowborough, in the Wealden district, in the county of East Sussex, England. It lies about 0.9 miles (1.4 km) from Crowborough town centre in the ecclesiastical parish of Withyham. In the 2021 Census, the electoral ward of Crowborough had a population of 3,135.

The village used to be called Crowborough Town before adopting the name of the church. Archaeological investigations were undertaken north of the village church in 2026 to discover the locations of graves prior to building work. This resulted in the publication of an archaeological evaluation, and an archaeological Strip and Map.
