= Jarvis Brook =

Village in East Sussex, England

Coordinates: 51.04899°N 0.18668°E

- Village and ecclesiastical parish
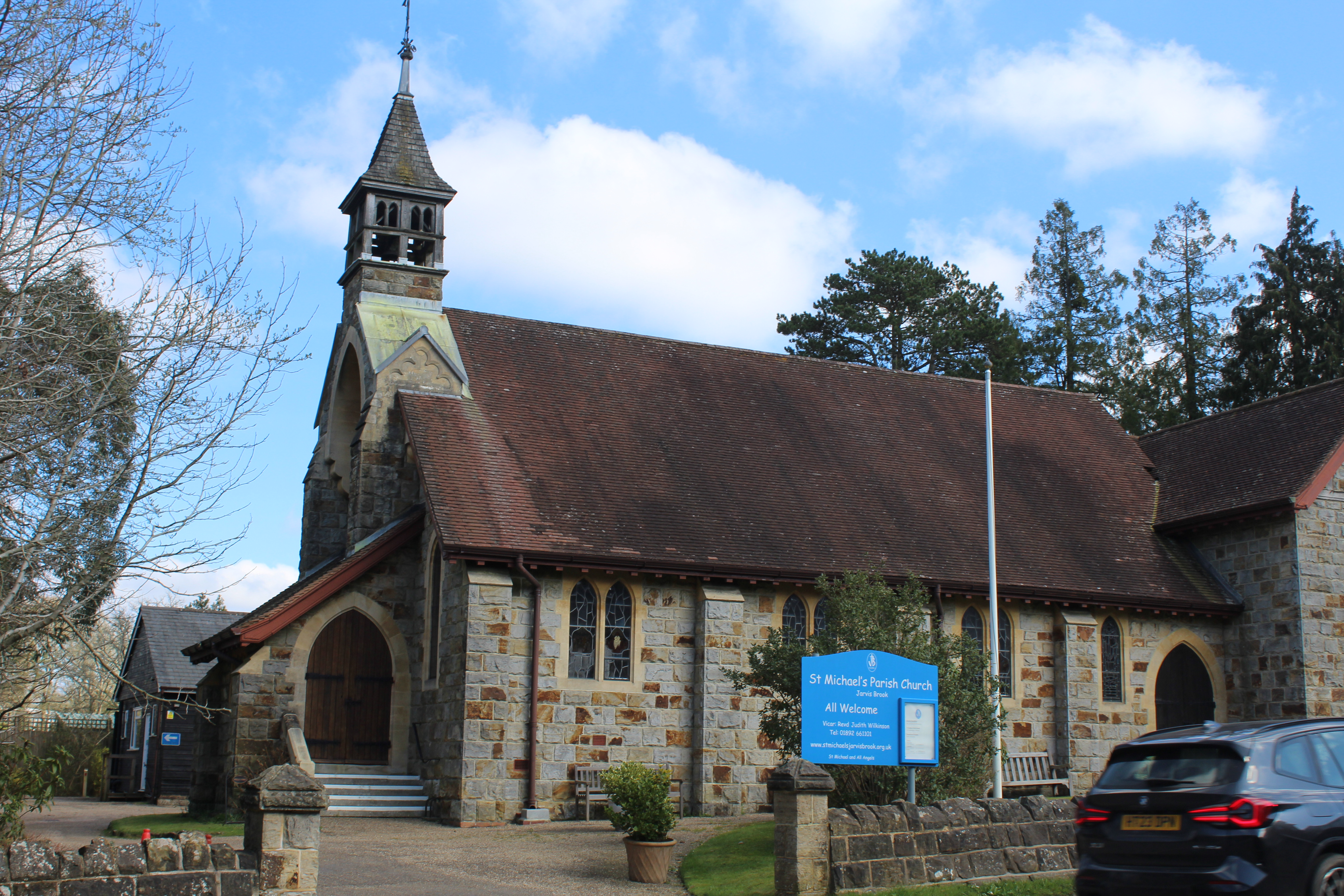
- St Michael and All Angels church

- Location within East Sussex
- Area: 2.6 km^{2} (1.0 sq mi)
- Population: 4,305
  - Density: 4,305/sq mi (1,662/km^{2})
- OS grid reference: TQ533300
- Civil parish: Crowborough
- District: Wealden
- Shire county: East Sussex
- Region: South East
- Country: England
- Sovereign state: United Kingdom
- Post town: CROWBOROUGH
- Postcode district: TN6
- Dialling code: 01892
- Police: Sussex
- Fire: East Sussex
- Ambulance: South East Coast
- UK Parliament: Sussex Weald

Jarvis Brook is a village and church parish in the Wealden District of East Sussex, England. It lies in the Jarvis Brook valley to the south-east of the Crowborough civil parish, about 1.5 miles (2.4 km) from Crowborough town centre.

In the 2021 Census, the electoral ward of the same name had a population of 4,305.

Jarvis Brook has grown enough that to the north, Jarvis Brook Ward takes some of the land of the neighbouring village of Steel Cross.

== History ==
Jarvis Brook was not mentioned in the Domesday Book from 1068, but is mentioned in a custumal from 1346, being spelt as "Gervys Brook". The spelling may have been influenced by Priscilla Jarvis of Mayfield, who owned land in the village. The earliest record of the village on a map is one from 1789.

The Rotherfield Hall is a Grade II* listed building to the south-east of Jarvis Brook on a 26 hectare park, built in 1535 for the Fowles family, iron manufacturers in Wealden. It was largely extended in 1897 by Francis Inigo Thomas for Sir Lindsay Lindsay-Hogg. It was temporarily used as a school during the 20th century.

The village grew when Crowborough railway station, on the Uckfield branch of the Oxted line, opened in the village, outside an area known as The Square. It was historically known as Crowborough and Jarvis Brook. Despite the brickworks opening in 1879, sidings there were opened in 7 years prior in 1872. The brickworks later closed in early 1980 and the quarry feeding it was turned into a local nature reserve in 2009.

The village has a baptist chapel that opened in 1876 called the Rethoboth Chapel. The chapel was previously abandoned, however reopened in August 2022.

A church school was built on the site of St Michael and All Angels church in 1882 on land lent by Lord Abergavenny, with the church following suite in 1902. The church became its own parish in 1934.

The Jarvis Brook Memorial Hall is a hall that was constructed and given to the people by wealthy landowners around the 1920s and has been used for various purposes, including a World War 2 hospital, where it got its namesake. In more recent times, the hall has fallen into a state of disrepair, with funding needed for the roof.

== Transportation ==
The village gets an hourly service from Crowborough railway station, and an infrequent local bus around the village and to Crowborough nearby. Two bus lines operated by Wealdlink serve the village, one heading to Wadhurst and the other heading down to Battle.

The B2157 runs along the north of the village and terminates at the B2100, which cuts straight through the village and heads down to Lamberhurst.

== Nature ==
Jarvis Brook contains many unique plants, containing "the largest cowslips in Sussex", as described in a book written in 1904 by E.V. Lucas. Within the Crowborough Country Park in Jarvis Brook are a nationally rare species of moss called flag-moss.

=== The Jarvis Brook ===
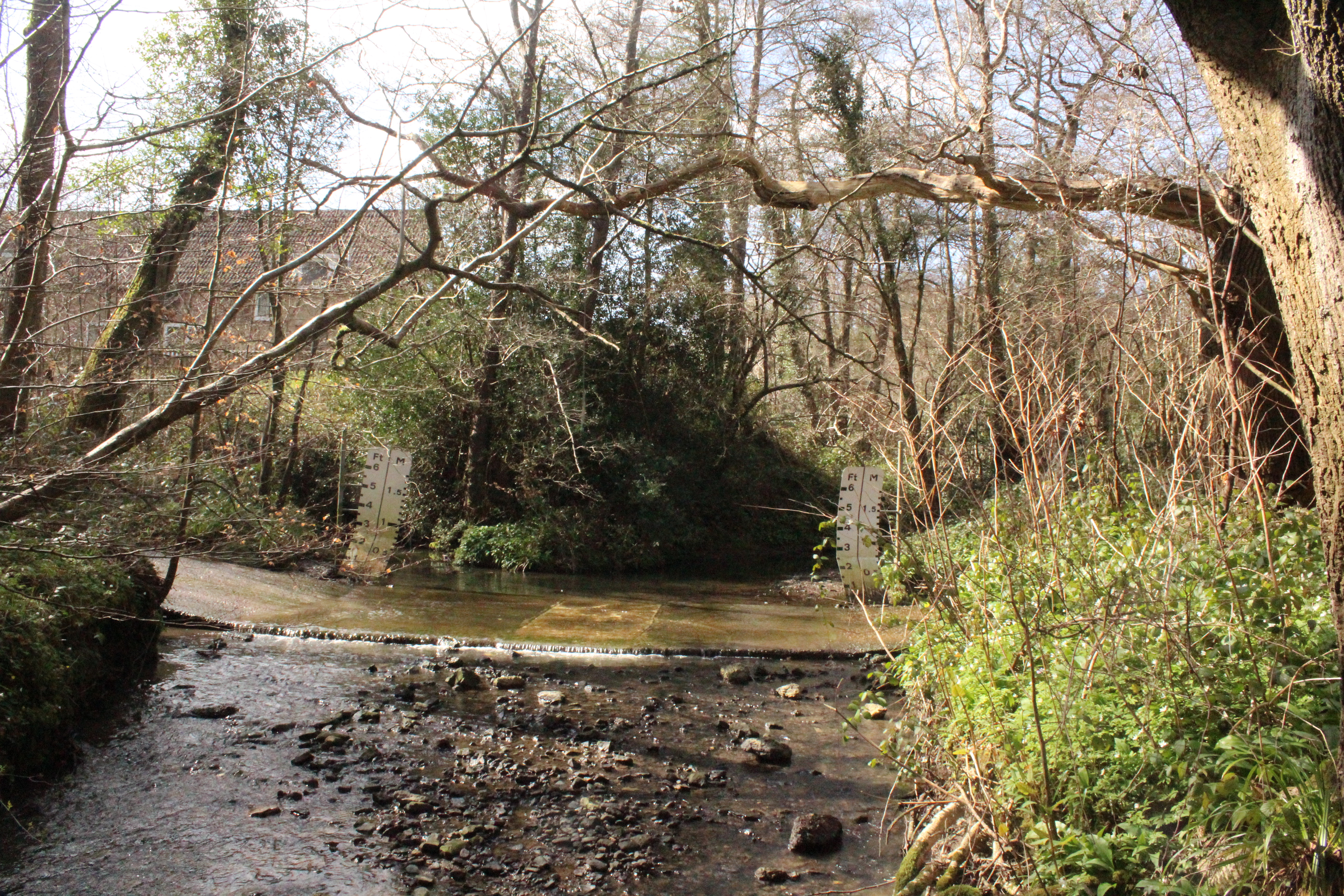
The Jarvis Brook from Palesgate Lane ford, locally known as "The Watersplash".

The Jarvis Brook is a small river that gave the name to the village. It flows from several tributaries around Crowborough and is part of the Medway Upper catchment area. The river feeds into the Eridge Stream.

Along the river was Maynards Gate Furnace, a blast iron furnace. It was working in 1653 but ruined by 1664. It served the Maynards Gate Forge, which shared the same pond as the Furnace. The only modern evidence of its existence is the sudden ending of leat in a leveled area along the river downstream.

The Environment Agency measures the water quality of the river systems in England. Each is given an overall ecological status, which may be one of five levels: high, good, moderate, poor and bad. There are several components that are used to determine this, including biological status, which looks at the quantity and varieties of invertebrates, angiosperms and fish. Chemical status, which compares the concentrations of various chemicals against known safe concentrations, is rated good or fail.

The water quality of the Jarvis Brook is as follows:

Section	Ecological status	Chemical Status	Overall status	Length	Catchment
Jarvis Brook	Moderate	Fail	Moderate	4.033 km (2.506 mi)	14.024 km^{2} (5.415 sq mi)

== Notable people ==
- Cate Blanchett currently resides in Highwell House, on Steep Road to the south of the village.
- Richard Jefferies lived briefly at Rehoboth Villa (now Brook View House) near the Rehoboth Chapel.
- Sam Taylor-Johnson resided in a converted schoolhouse as a child and attended Beacon Academy.
