= 2007 Wealden District Council election =

2007 UK local government election

Map of the results of the 2007 Wealden council election. Conservatives in blue, Liberal Democrats in yellow, Independents in grey and Greens in green.

The 2007 Wealden District Council election took place on 3 May 2007 to elect members of Wealden District Council in East Sussex, England. The whole council was up for election and the Conservative Party stayed in overall control of the council.

== Background ==
At the 2003 election the Conservatives held control of the council with 34 seats, compared to 15 for the Liberal Democrats and 6 independents. However, in September 2006 Liberal Democrat councillor Stephen Shing was expelled from the Liberal Democrats and continued on the council as an independent.

The Conservatives took 4 seats without any opposition and were also guaranteed seats in other wards where there were not enough candidates from other parties for the number of seats being contested. The returning officer for Wealden, Charlie Lant, formed a band called The Council Tax Band with other council officers and performed a song called Vote! in an effort to boost turnout at the election.

An important issue at the election was a legal loophole, which was allowing developers to build increased numbers of houses in the area.

== Election result ==
The Conservatives held control of the council staying on 34 seats, but both the Conservative leader of the council Nigel Coltman and the Liberal Democrat group leader Laura Murphy were defeated. The Liberal Democrats lost 2 seats, dropping to 12 councillors, while independents remained on 7 seats and the Green party won its first councillors on the council after gaining 2 seats. Overall turnout at the election was 38.51%, up from 35% in 2003.

The Conservative leader Nigel Coltman was defeated by Liberal Democrat Brian Cook in Hailsham East by a 55-vote majority, with the Conservatives also losing 2 seats to the Greens in Forest Row. However the Conservatives did not suffer a net loss of seats as they also made gains including defeating the Liberal Democrat group leader Laura Murphy in Hailsham Central and North. The Liberal Democrats did gain a seat in Polegate South from an independent by 1 vote, but Stephen Shing was re-elected as an independent in Willingdon, while Shing's son Daniel also gained a seat in the same ward and Shing's wife Oi Lin gained one in Polegate North.

Wealden local election result 2007
Party	Seats	Gains	Losses	Net gain/loss	Seats %	Votes %	Votes	+/−
Conservative	34	3	3	0	61.8	54.6	36,928	+5.2%
Liberal Democrats	12	3	5	-2	21.8	23.4	15,820	-11.6%
Independent	7	2	2	0	12.7	15.0	10,153	+5.5%
Green	2	2	0	+2	3.6	6.0	4,082	+4.1%
Labour	0	0	0	0	0	0.6	424	-3.3%
English Democrat	0	0	0	0	0	0.3	190	+0.3%
UKIP	0	0	0	0	0	0.1	57	-0.1%

== Ward results ==
Alfriston
Party	Candidate	Votes	%	±%
Conservative	Keith Whitehead	707	71.8	+4.5
Liberal Democrats	Christine Page	277	28.2	−4.5
Majority		430	43.7	+9.1
Turnout		984	48.5	−1.0
Conservative hold		Swing		

Buxted and Maresfield (2)
Party	Candidate	Votes	%	±%
Conservative	Norman Buck	1,203		
Conservative	Ken Ogden	1,115		
Liberal Democrats	Michael Cooper	394		
Turnout		2,712	39.0	+2.8
Conservative hold		Swing		
Conservative hold		Swing		

Chiddingly and East Hoathly
Party	Candidate	Votes	%	±%
Conservative	Barby Dashwood-Hall	628	66.2	
Liberal Democrats	Barbara Holbrook	321	33.8	
Majority		307	32.4	
Turnout		949	42.3	
Conservative hold		Swing		

Cross-in-Hand/Five Ashes
Party	Candidate	Votes	%	±%
Conservative	Jonica Fox	unopposed		
Conservative hold		Swing		

Crowborough East (2)
Party	Candidate	Votes	%	±%
Conservative	Sylvia Tidy	581		
Liberal Democrats	Jane Clark	579		
Conservative	Pat Kennedy	565		
Liberal Democrats	Ian Mein	510		
Green	Sarah Hale	185		
Green	Scott Mason	133		
Turnout		2,553	33.5	+6.0
Conservative gain from Liberal Democrats		Swing		
Liberal Democrats hold		Swing		

Crowborough Jarvis Brook
Party	Candidate	Votes	%	±%
Liberal Democrats	Martin Prestage	222	45.0	+6.2
Conservative	John Stevens	215	43.6	+21.5
Green	Colin Stocks	56	11.4	+11.4
Majority		7	1.4	
Turnout		493	25.3	−3.5
Liberal Democrats gain from Independent		Swing		

Crowborough North (2)
Party	Candidate	Votes	%	±%
Independent	Chantal Wilson	1,108		
Conservative	David Larkin	739		
Liberal Democrats	Adrian Morris	530		
Turnout		2,377	37.9	+2.1
Independent hold		Swing		
Conservative hold		Swing		

Crowborough St Johns
Party	Candidate	Votes	%	±%
Conservative	Jim Hollins	469	59.4	−15.9
English Democrat	Paul Adams	190	24.1	+24.1
Labour	Jean McCarthy	47	6.0	−1.7
Liberal Democrats	Valerie Banks	43	5.4	−11.5
Green	Gabrielle Symonds	40	5.1	+5.1
Majority		279	35.4	−23.0
Turnout		789	40.4	+8.4
Conservative hold		Swing		

Crowborough West (2)
Party	Candidate	Votes	%	±%
Conservative	Diane Phillips	992		
Conservative	Antony Quin	954		
Liberal Democrats	Edward Willis	336		
Labour	Brendan Clegg	192		
Turnout		2,474	34.9	+2.7
Conservative hold		Swing		
Conservative hold		Swing		

Danehill/Fletching/Nutley (2)
Party	Candidate	Votes	%	±%
Conservative	Roy Galley	unopposed		
Conservative	Sylvia Martin	unopposed		
Conservative hold		Swing		
Conservative hold		Swing		

East Dean
Party	Candidate	Votes	%	±%
Conservative	Charles Peck	793	81.6	+13.8
Liberal Democrats	Howard Coote	179	18.4	−13.8
Majority		614	63.2	+27.5
Turnout		972	50.8	+3.9
Conservative hold		Swing		

Forest Row (2)
Party	Candidate	Votes	%	±%
Green	David Jonas	938		
Green	Vania Phitidis	877		
Conservative	Rowena Moore	839		
Conservative	Peter Davey	826		
Turnout		3,480	46.9	+13.4
Green gain from Conservative		Swing		
Green gain from Conservative		Swing		

Framfield
Party	Candidate	Votes	%	±%
Conservative	Ann Newton	704	72.6	+7.7
Liberal Democrats	Steve Hey	209	21.5	+2.1
UKIP	Keith Riddle	57	5.9	−9.9
Majority		495	51.0	+5.5
Turnout		970	45.3	+3.1
Conservative hold		Swing		

Frant/Withyham
Party	Candidate	Votes	%	±%
Conservative	Johanna Howell	1,072		
Conservative	John Padfield	955		
Green	Keith Obbard	566		
Turnout		2,593	39.5	+0.9
Conservative hold		Swing		
Conservative hold		Swing		

Hailsham Central and North (2)
Party	Candidate	Votes	%	±%
Liberal Democrats	Paul Holbrook	687		
Conservative	Jo Bentley	644		
Liberal Democrats	Laura Murphy	641		
Conservative	Angela Geall	577		
Independent	John Glover	291		
Independent	Robin Kempe	242		
Turnout		3,082	36.1	+4.0
Liberal Democrats hold		Swing		
Conservative gain from Liberal Democrats		Swing		

Hailsham East
Party	Candidate	Votes	%	±%
Liberal Democrats	Brian Cock	323	54.7	+29.4
Conservative	Nigel Coltman	268	45.3	+11.6
Majority		55	9.4	
Turnout		591	30.2	+3.6
Liberal Democrats gain from Conservative		Swing		

Hailsham South and West (3)
Party	Candidate	Votes	%	±%
Independent	Nick Ellwood	742		
Independent	Ian Haffenden	690		
Independent	Geoff Rowe	675		
Conservative	Lynn Bowman	628		
Liberal Democrats	Anne Blake-Coggins	606		
Liberal Democrats	Ann Murrey	599		
Conservative	Arthur Kay	508		
Conservative	Ginny Heard	497		
Turnout		4,945	29.1	+0.4
Independent hold		Swing		
Independent hold		Swing		
Independent hold		Swing		

Hartfield
Party	Candidate	Votes	%	±%
Conservative	Michael Hoy	661	60.6	
Liberal Democrats	Mike Burbridge	294	27.0	
Green	Heidi Ruse	135	12.4	
Majority		367	33.6	
Turnout		1,090	52.5	
Conservative hold		Swing		

Heathfield East
Party	Candidate	Votes	%	±%
Conservative	Jan Dunk	unopposed		
Conservative hold		Swing		

Heathfield North and Central (3)
Party	Candidate	Votes	%	±%
Conservative	Dick Angel	1,423		
Conservative	Margaret Kirkpatrick	1,337		
Conservative	Niki Oakes	1,303		
Liberal Democrats	Jim Benson	561		
Turnout		4,624	33.2	+5.0
Conservative hold		Swing		
Conservative hold		Swing		
Conservative hold		Swing		

Hellingly (2)
Party	Candidate	Votes	%	±%
Liberal Democrats	John Blake	943		
Liberal Democrats	David White	929		
Conservative	Keith Byatt	727		
Conservative	James Kennedy	653		
Turnout		3,252	39.7	+2.8
Liberal Democrats hold		Swing		
Liberal Democrats hold		Swing		

Herstmonceux
Party	Candidate	Votes	%	±%
Conservative	Andy Long	559	69.0	+5.9
Independent	Laurence Keeley	251	31.0	+31.0
Majority		308	38.0	+11.8
Turnout		810	37.6	+1.1
Conservative hold		Swing		

Horam
Party	Candidate	Votes	%	±%
Conservative	Susan Stedman	570	75.1	+18.2
Liberal Democrats	Lois Norton	189	24.9	−18.2
Majority		381	50.2	+36.5
Turnout		759	36.6	+3.4
Conservative hold		Swing		

Mayfield
Party	Candidate	Votes	%	±%
Conservative	Brian Redman	647	72.3	+18.0
Liberal Democrats	Sharon Cottingham	124	13.9	−31.8
Green	Derek Forman	124	13.9	+13.9
Majority		523	58.4	+49.9
Turnout		895	43.7	+2.0
Conservative hold		Swing		

Ninfield and Hooe with Wartling
Party	Candidate	Votes	%	±%
Conservative	Pam Doodes	633	83.1	
Liberal Democrats	Edward Thompson	129	16.9	
Majority		504	66.2	
Turnout		762	39.2	
Conservative hold		Swing		

Pevensey and Westham (3)
Party	Candidate	Votes	%	±%
Conservative	Kevin Balsdon	1,439		
Conservative	Dianne Dear	1,417		
Conservative	Lin McKeever	1,312		
Liberal Democrats	Christine Thomas	893		
Turnout		5,061	31.7	+2.0
Conservative hold		Swing		
Conservative hold		Swing		
Conservative hold		Swing		

Polegate North (2)
Party	Candidate	Votes	%	±%
Independent	Oi Shing	764		
Liberal Democrats	Roy Martin	683		
Liberal Democrats	Chris Berry	554		
Independent	John Harmer	394		
Independent	Gerald Carter	333		
Conservative	Derrick Wilkins	271		
Green	Peter Wright	108		
Turnout		3,107	42.8	+5.1
Independent gain from Liberal Democrats		Swing		
Liberal Democrats hold		Swing		

Polegate South
Party	Candidate	Votes	%	±%
Liberal Democrats	Don Broadbent	302	36.9	+5.3
Independent	Ivy Scarborough	301	36.8	−8.9
Conservative	Anne McIlvenny	216	26.4	+3.7
Majority		1	0.1	
Turnout		819	41.7	+3.0
Liberal Democrats gain from Independent		Swing		

Rotherfield
Party	Candidate	Votes	%	±%
Conservative	Huw Merriman	620	77.7	+30.3
Liberal Democrats	Graham Morgan	178	22.3	−23.4
Majority		442	55.4	+53.6
Turnout		798	42.7	+1.0
Conservative hold		Swing		

Uckfield Central
Party	Candidate	Votes	%	±%
Conservative	Claire Dowling	542	58.0	+5.3
Liberal Democrats	Dorothy Sparks	392	42.0	+3.8
Majority		150	16.1	+1.6
Turnout		934	40.3	+5.2
Conservative hold		Swing		

Uckfield New Town
Party	Candidate	Votes	%	±%
Liberal Democrats	Julia Hey	410	63.4	+9.2
Conservative	Terence Clark	237	36.6	+13.8
Majority		173	26.7	−4.5
Turnout		647	31.4	+0.4
Liberal Democrats hold		Swing		

Uckfield North (2)
Party	Candidate	Votes	%	±%
Liberal Democrats	Paul Sparks	693		
Liberal Democrats	Alan Whittaker	532		
Conservative	Michael Lunn	453		
Conservative	Anne Sabine	373		
Green	Sam Bryant	250		
Turnout		2,301	30.0	+2.2
Liberal Democrats hold		Swing		
Liberal Democrats hold		Swing		

Uckfield Ridgewood
Party	Candidate	Votes	%	±%
Liberal Democrats	Robert Sweetland	469	51.6	−5.6
Conservative	Kim Clark	440	48.4	+11.7
Majority		29	3.2	−17.3
Turnout		909	40.9	+1.8
Liberal Democrats hold		Swing		

Wadhurst (2)
Party	Candidate	Votes	%	±%
Conservative	Bob Standley	1,069		
Conservative	Graham Wells	1,052		
Green	Beth Martin	390		
Labour	Bruce Meredeen	185		
Turnout		2,696	38.4	+6.4
Conservative hold		Swing		
Conservative hold		Swing		

Willingdon (3)
Party	Candidate	Votes	%	±%
Independent	Stephen Shing	2,275		
Independent	Daniel Shing	2,087		
Conservative	Ron Cussons	890		
Conservative	Dick Broady	812		
Conservative	Douglas Murray	793		
Liberal Democrats	Andy Watkins	614		
Liberal Democrats	Kay Dewick	475		
Green	Izzy Riach	280		
Turnout		8,226	57.1	+8.4
Independent hold		Swing		
Independent gain from Liberal Democrats		Swing		
Conservative gain from Liberal Democrats		Swing		

== By-elections between 2007 and 2011 ==
=== Uckfield New Town ===
A by-election was held in Uckfield New Town on 17 July 2008 after Liberal Democrat councillor Julia Hey resigned from the council.

Uckfield New Town By-Election 17 July 2008
Party	Candidate	Votes	%	±%
Liberal Democrats	Carol Sweetland	311	47.4	−16.0
Conservative	John Carvey	289	44.1	+7.5
UKIP	Michael Pursglove	56	8.5	+8.5
Majority		22	3.3	−23.4
Turnout		656	31.8	+0.4
Liberal Democrats hold		Swing		

=== Alfriston ===
A by-election was held in Alfriston on 25 September 2008 after Conservative Keith Whitehead stood down from the council. The seat was gained from the Conservatives by Liberal Democrat Andy Watkins with a 30-vote majority, defeating the former Conservative leader of Wealden council, Nigel Coltman who had been trying to return to the council.

Alfriston By-Election 25 September 2008
Party	Candidate	Votes	%	±%
Liberal Democrats	Andrew Watkins	495	51.6	+23.4
Conservative	Nigel Coltman	465	48.4	−23.4
Majority		30	3.2	
Turnout		960	48.0	−0.5
Liberal Democrats gain from Conservative		Swing		

=== Heathfield North and Central ===
A by-election was held in Heathfield North and Central on 23 September 2010 after the death of Conservative councillor Niki Oakes in June 2010.

Heathfield North and Central By-Election 23 September 2010
Party	Candidate	Votes	%	±%
Conservative	Peter Newnham	802	69.2	−2.5
Liberal Democrats	Jim Benson	357	30.8	+2.5
Majority		445	38.4	
Turnout		1,159	19.4	−13.8
Conservative hold		Swing		
