= 2015 Wealden District Council election =

Election

Map of the results

The 2015 Wealden District Council election took place on 7 May 2015 to elect members of the Wealden District Council in England. It was held on the same day as other local elections.

== Results ==
Conservative: 50 seats
Independent: 5 seats

== By-elections between 2015 and 2019 ==
=== Hellingly ===
A by-election was held in Hellingly on 29 October 2015 after the resignation of Conservative councillor Paul Soane, who stood in the by-election as an independent. The seat was gained by Liberal Democrats candidate David White.

Hellingly by-election 29 October 2015
Party	Candidate	Votes	%	±%
Liberal Democrats	David White	875	69.9	+34.9
Conservative	Alex Willis	222	17.7	−30.4
Independent	Paul Soane	154	12.3	+12.3
Majority		653	52.2	
Turnout		1,251		
Liberal Democrats gain from Conservative		Swing		

=== Crowborough East ===
A by-election was held in Crowborough East on 21 January 2016 after the death of Conservative councillor Peter Cowie. The seat was won by Conservative candidate Philip Lunn.

Crowborough East by-election 21 January 2016
Party	Candidate	Votes	%	±%
Conservative	Philip Lunn	517	64.0	−1.3
Liberal Democrats	Jane Clark	198	24.5	−10.2
Labour	Linda Scotson	93	11.5	+11.5
Majority		319	39.5	
Turnout		808		
Conservative hold		Swing		

=== Chiddingly and East Hoathly ===
A by-election was held in Chiddingly and East Hoathly on 20 July 2017 after the disqualification of Conservative councillor Barby Dashwood-Morris due to non-attendance. The seat was won by Conservative candidate David Watts.

Crowborough East by-election 20 July 2017
Party	Candidate	Votes	%	±%
Conservative	David Watts	349	53.4	−11.2
Labour	Tony Fielding	185	28.3	+9.4
Liberal Democrats	Paul Holbrook	120	18.3	+18.3
Majority		164	25.1	
Turnout		654		
Conservative hold		Swing		
