= 2019 Wealden District Council election =

2019 UK local government election

Map of the results

The 2019 Wealden District Council election took place on 2 May 2019 to elect all members of Wealden District Council in England. Due to new ward boundaries, the number of total seats was reduced to 45 seats, elected from 41 wards.

== Summary ==
=== Election result ===
2019 Wealden District Council election
Party	Candidates	Seats	Gains	Losses	Net gain/loss	Seats %	Votes %	Votes	+/−
Conservative	44	34	N/A	N/A	▼16	75.6	45.2	21,377	–10.7
Independent	11	5	N/A	N/A	Steady	11.1	11.6	5,484	+1.4
Liberal Democrats	24	4	N/A	N/A	▲4	8.9	13.7	6,500	+2.3
Green	25	2	N/A	N/A	▲2	4.4	19.2	9,077	+14.4
Labour	27	0	N/A	N/A	Steady	0.0	8.9	4,227	+3.9
UKIP	5	0	N/A	N/A	Steady	0.0	1.4	680	–11.4

== Ward results ==
=== Arlington ===
Arlington
Party	Candidate	Votes	%	±%
Conservative	David Watts	486	48.8	
Green	Kay Syrad	300	30.1	
Liberal Democrats	Catherine Hall	210	21.1	
Majority				
Turnout		1,025	41.9	
Registered electors		2,444		
Rejected ballots		27	2.6	
Conservative win (new seat)				

=== Buxted ===
Buxted
Party	Candidate	Votes	%	±%
Conservative	Toby Illingworth	647	59.3	
Green	Caroline Coxon	357	32.7	
Labour	Mark Chapman	87	8.0	
Majority				
Turnout		1,104	39.7	
Registered electors		2,782		
Rejected ballots		13	1.2	
Conservative win (new seat)				

=== Chiddingly, East Hoathly & Waldron ===
Chiddingly, East Hoathly & Waldron
Party	Candidate	Votes	%	±%
Conservative	Geoffrey Draper	604	55.0	
Green	Alison Wilson	225	20.5	
Liberal Democrats	Katrina Best	150	13.7	
Labour	Rupert Wilkinson	119	10.8	
Majority				
Turnout		1,126	41.3	
Registered electors		2,724		
Rejected ballots		28	2.5	
Conservative win (new seat)				

=== Crowborough Central ===
Crowborough Central
Party	Candidate	Votes	%	±%
Conservative	Ronald Reed	409	51.0	
Independent	Peter Bucklitsch	225	28.1	
Labour	Michael Coyne	168	20.9	
Majority				
Turnout		828	28.7	
Registered electors		2,880		
Rejected ballots		25	3.0	
Conservative win (new seat)				

=== Crowborough Jarvis Brook ===
Crowborough Jarvis Brook
Party	Candidate	Votes	%	±%
Liberal Democrats	Gareth Owen-Williams	334	37.7	
Conservative	Barry Marlowe	220	24.9	
Labour	David Neeves	189	21.4	
Green	Colin Stocks	142	16.0	
Majority				
Turnout		909	30.6	
Registered electors		2,970		
Rejected ballots		24	2.6	
Liberal Democrats win (new seat)				

=== Crowborough North ===
Crowborough North
Party	Candidate	Votes	%	±%
Conservative	Kay Moss	480	51.9	
Green	Nigel Fox	293	31.7	
Labour	Anthony Stevenson	151	16.3	
Majority				
Turnout		944	33.6	
Registered electors		2,807		
Rejected ballots		18	1.9	
Conservative win (new seat)				

=== Crowborough South East ===
Crowborough South East
Party	Candidate	Votes	%	±%
Conservative	Philip Lunn	368	46.4	
Liberal Democrats	Adrian Morris	302	38.1	
Labour	Stuart Snowden	123	15.5	
Majority				
Turnout		828	30.5	
Registered electors		2,713		
Rejected ballots		34	4.1	
Conservative win (new seat)				

=== Crowborough South West ===
Crowborough South West
Party	Candidate	Votes	%	±%
Conservative	Neil Waller	336	51.5	
Liberal Democrats	Alison Arthur	152	23.3	
Green	Pamela Tysh	92	13.9	
Labour	Brendan Clegg	72	10.9	
Majority				
Turnout		676	26.8	
Registered electors		2,524		
Rejected ballots		23	3.4	
Conservative win (new seat)				

=== Crowborough St Johns ===
Crowborough St Johns
Party	Candidate	Votes	%	±%
Conservative	Richard Hallett	626	63.4	
Green	Gabrielle Symonds	362	36.6	
Majority				
Turnout		1,007	36.5	
Registered electors		2,756		
Rejected ballots		19	1.9	
Conservative win (new seat)				

=== Danehill & Fletching ===
Danehill & Fletching
Party	Candidate	Votes	%	±%
Conservative	Roy Galley	749	58.9	
Green	Simon Darlington-Cramond	523	41.1	
Majority				
Turnout		1,301	40.0	
Registered electors		3,249		
Rejected ballots		29	2.2	
Conservative win (new seat)				

=== Forest Row ===
Forest Row
Party	Candidate	Votes	%	±%
Green	Diana Patterson-Vanegas	1,212	79.1	
Conservative	Rowena Moore	321	20.9	
Majority				
Turnout		1,543	53.3	
Registered electors		2,897		
Rejected ballots		10	0.6	
Green win (new seat)				

=== Framfield & Cross-in-Hand ===
Framfield & Cross-in-Hand
Party	Candidate	Votes	%	±%
Conservative	Ann Newton	574	58.2	
Green	Timothy Parry	250	25.3	
UKIP	Graham Shevill	84	8.5	
Labour	Laura Burstow	79	8.0	
Majority				
Turnout		996	39.0	
Registered electors		2,556		
Rejected ballots		6	0.6	
Conservative win (new seat)				

=== Frant & Wadhurst ===
Frant & Wadhurst (2 seats)
Party	Candidate	Votes	%	±%
Conservative	Johanna Howell	917	49.8	
Conservative	Robert Standley	904	49.1	
Green	Beth Martin	688	37.4	
Liberal Democrats	Bruce Meredeen	404	21.9	
Labour	Felicity Harvest	277	15.0	
Labour	Christopher Morris	148	8.0	
Majority				
Turnout		1,880	36.6	
Registered electors		5,141		
Rejected ballots		39	2.1	
Conservative win (new seat)				
Conservative win (new seat)				

=== Hadlow Down & Rotherfield ===
Hadlow Down & Rotherfield
Party	Candidate	Votes	%	±%
Conservative	Philip Dixon	581	61.5	
Green	Felicity Thompson	363	38.5	
Majority				
Turnout		976	38.1	
Registered electors		2,564		
Rejected ballots		32	3.3	
Conservative win (new seat)				

=== Hailsham Central ===
Hailsham Central
Party	Candidate	Votes	%	±%
Conservative	Nigel Coltman	296	40.3	
Liberal Democrats	Paul Holbrook	237	32.2	
Green	Charlotte Still	132	18.0	
Labour	Kay Coxon	70	9.5	
Majority				
Turnout		758	30.2	
Registered electors		2,511		
Rejected ballots		22	2.9	
Conservative win (new seat)				

=== Hailsham East ===
Hailsham East
Party	Candidate	Votes	%	±%
Liberal Democrats	Gavin Blake-Coggins	356	59.0	
Conservative	Amanda O'Rawe	247	41.0	
Majority				
Turnout		628	20.8	
Registered electors		3,012		
Rejected ballots		25	4.0	
Liberal Democrats win (new seat)				

=== Hailsham North ===
Hailsham North
Party	Candidate	Votes	%	±%
Conservative	Nicholas Collinson	247	33.3	
Liberal Democrats	Barbara Holbrook	208	28.0	
Green	Rachel Chilton	175	23.6	
Labour	Malcolm Richards	112	15.1	
Majority				
Turnout		761	29.5	
Registered electors		2,584		
Rejected ballots		18	2.4	
Conservative win (new seat)				

=== Hailsham North West ===
Hailsham North West
Party	Candidate	Votes	%	±%
Liberal Democrats	Neil Cleaver	398	54.1	
Conservative	Kevin Balsdon	338	45.9	
Majority				
Turnout		775	30.0	
Registered electors		2,583		
Rejected ballots		39	5.0	
Liberal Democrats win (new seat)				

=== Hailsham South ===
Hailsham South
Party	Candidate	Votes	%	±%
Conservative	Chriss Triandafyllou	319	46.6	
Liberal Democrats	Anne Blake-Coggins	197	28.8	
Labour	Joshua Funnell	169	24.7	
Majority				
Turnout		738	25.8	
Registered electors		2,858		
Rejected ballots		52	7.0	
Conservative win (new seat)				

=== Hailsham West ===
Hailsham West
Party	Candidate	Votes	%	±%
Conservative	Richard Grocock	362	45.6	
Liberal Democrats	Stephen Murphy	288	36.3	
Labour	Laura Jordan	144	18.1	
Majority				
Turnout		846	28.6	
Registered electors		2,962		
Rejected ballots		52	6.1	
Conservative win (new seat)				

=== Hartfield ===
Hartfield
Party	Candidate	Votes	%	±%
Conservative	Christopher Hardy	566	56.9	
Green	Vania Phitidis	428	43.1	
Majority				
Turnout		1,023	35.9	
Registered electors		2,851		
Rejected ballots		28	2.7	
Conservative win (new seat)				

=== Heathfield North ===
Heathfield North
Party	Candidate	Votes	%	±%
Conservative	Richard Angel	537	59.9	
Liberal Democrats	James Kerr	226	25.2	
Labour	Gregory Savva	134	14.9	
Majority				
Turnout		939	30.8	
Registered electors		3,053		
Rejected ballots		41	4.4	
Conservative win (new seat)				

=== Heathfield South ===
Heathfield South
Party	Candidate	Votes	%	±%
Conservative	John "Roger" Thomas	564	68.4	
Labour	David Newman	260	31.6	
Majority				
Turnout		876	29.2	
Registered electors		3,001		
Rejected ballots		49	5.6	
Conservative win (new seat)				

=== Hellingly ===
Hellingly
Party	Candidate	Votes	%	±%
Independent	David White	580	62.9	
Conservative	Stephen Potts	239	25.9	
Labour	Janet Perez	103	11.2	
Majority				
Turnout		928	31.6	
Registered electors		2,939		
Rejected ballots		6	0.6	
Independent win (new seat)				

=== Herstmonceux & Pevensey Levels ===
Herstmonceux & Pevensey Levels (2 seats)
Party	Candidate	Votes	%	±%
Conservative	Pamela Doodes	823	39.0	
Conservative	Raymond Cade	677	32.1	
Green	Eve Ashley	547	25.9	
Liberal Democrats	Paul Coleshill	502	23.8	
Independent	Alistair Slater	494	23.4	
Independent	Laurence Keeley	427	20.2	
Labour	Barry Simons	232	11.0	
Majority				
Turnout		2,125	39.0	
Registered electors		5,445		
Rejected ballots		16	0.8	
Conservative win (new seat)				
Conservative win (new seat)				

=== Horam & Punnetts Town ===
Horam & Punnetts Town (2 seats)
Party	Candidate	Votes	%	±%
Conservative	Robert Bowdler	989	47.5	
Conservative	Susan Stedman	913	43.9	
Independent	Andrew Long	730	35.1	
Green	Cornelie Usborne	700	33.6	
Labour	Jonathan Prus	256	12.3	
Labour	Anthony Watson	199	9.6	
Majority				
Turnout		2,113	38.1	
Registered electors		5,546		
Rejected ballots		32	1.5	
Conservative win (new seat)				
Conservative win (new seat)				

=== Lower Willingdon ===
Lower Willingdon
Party	Candidate	Votes	%	±%
Independent	Stephen Shing	818	69.2	
Conservative	Giselle Bailey	240	20.3	
Liberal Democrats	Gillian Milton	124	10.5	
Majority				
Turnout		1,204	44.2	
Registered electors		2,723		
Rejected ballots		22	1.8	
Independent win (new seat)				

=== Maresfield ===
Maresfield
Party	Candidate	Votes	%	±%
Conservative	Peter Roundell	668	62.0	
Green	Ian Tysh	333	30.9	
Labour	George Wilson	76	7.1	
Majority				
Turnout		1,106	37.3	
Registered electors		2,964		
Rejected ballots		29	2.6	
Conservative win (new seat)				

=== Mayfield & Five Ashes ===
Mayfield & Five Ashes
Party	Candidate	Votes	%	±%
Conservative	Brian Redman	562	57.6	
Green	Cyril Bolam	325	33.3	
Labour	Jason Scott-Taggart	88	9.0	
Majority				
Turnout		1,006	35.7	
Registered electors		2,819		
Rejected ballots		31	3.1	
Conservative win (new seat)				

=== Pevensey Bay ===
Pevensey Bay
Party	Candidate	Votes	%	±%
Conservative	Lin Clark	297	30.5	
Independent	Daniel Brookbank	220	22.6	
UKIP	Michael Pursglove	196	20.1	
Liberal Democrats	Roanna Brewer	109	11.2	
Independent	Dianne Dear	98	10.1	
Labour	Aaron McConnell	54	5.5	
Majority				
Turnout		980	40.0	
Registered electors		2,448		
Rejected ballots		6	0.6	
Conservative win (new seat)				

=== Polegate Central ===
Polegate Central
Party	Candidate	Votes	%	±%
Conservative	Angela Snell	Unopposed	N/A	
Majority				
Turnout		N/A	N/A	
Conservative win (new seat)				

=== Polegate North ===
Polegate North
Party	Candidate	Votes	%	±%
Independent	Lin Shing	496	50.5	
Conservative	Eunice Mummery	175	17.8	
UKIP	Bernard Goodwin	141	14.4	
Liberal Democrats	Andrew Watkins	112	11.4	
Labour	Alexius Mthobi	58	5.9	
Majority				
Turnout		990	32.2	
Registered electors		3,076		
Rejected ballots		8	0.8	
Independent win (new seat)				

=== Polegate South & Willingdon Watermill ===
Polegate South & Willingdon Watermill
Party	Candidate	Votes	%	±%
Independent	Daniel Shing	752	72.6	
Conservative	Christopher Primett	170	16.4	
UKIP	Maureen Goodwin	114	11.0	
Majority				
Turnout		1,043	36.4	
Registered electors		2,865		
Rejected ballots		7	0.7	
Independent win (new seat)				

=== South Downs ===
South Downs
Party	Candidate	Votes	%	±%
Conservative	Michael Lunn	531	44.8	
Liberal Democrats	Vanessa Rowlands	449	37.9	
Green	Mark Poland	204	17.2	
Majority				
Turnout		1,202	46.6	
Registered electors		2,578		
Rejected ballots		18	1.5	
Conservative win (new seat)				

=== Stone Cross ===
Stone Cross
Party	Candidate	Votes	%	±%
Conservative	Alastair Douglas	324	52.2	
Green	Charlotte Cumber	297	47.8	
Majority				
Turnout		644	24.2	
Registered electors		2,662		
Rejected ballots		23	3.6	
Conservative win (new seat)				

=== Uckfield East ===
Uckfield East
Party	Candidate	Votes	%	±%
Liberal Democrats	Paul Sparks	527	56.1	
Conservative	Richard Broughton-Tompkins	268	28.5	
UKIP	Gareth Stell	145	15.4	
Majority				
Turnout		960	35.6	
Registered electors		2,693		
Rejected ballots		20	2.1	
Liberal Democrats win (new seat)				

=== Uckfield New Town ===
Uckfield New Town (2 seats)
Party	Candidate	Votes	%	±%
Conservative	Claire Dowling	706	37.6	
Conservative	Helen Firth	681	36.2	
Labour Co-op	Ben Cox	662	35.2	
Liberal Democrats	Michael Meakin	456	24.3	
Green	Melissa Petty	407	21.6	
Liberal Democrats	Carole Ridout	285	15.2	
Majority				
Turnout		1,926	39.8	
Registered electors		4,839		
Rejected ballots		46	2.4	
Conservative win (new seat)				
Conservative win (new seat)				

=== Uckfield North ===
Uckfield North
Party	Candidate	Votes	%	±%
Conservative	Peter Waldock	305	44.3	
Liberal Democrats	Timothy Murray	136	19.8	
Labour Co-op	Angela Smith	124	18.0	
Green	Simon Harriyott	123	17.9	
Majority				
Turnout		702	29.0	
Registered electors		2,417		
Rejected ballots		14	2.0	
Conservative win (new seat)				

=== Uckfield Ridgewood & Little Horsted ===
Uckfield Ridgewood & Little Horsted
Party	Candidate	Votes	%	±%
Conservative	Gary Johnson	296	44.0	
Liberal Democrats	James Edwards	203	30.2	
Green	Toby Quantrill	100	14.9	
Labour	Anthony Fielding	73	10.9	
Majority				
Turnout		686	36.7	
Registered electors		1,871		
Rejected ballots		14	2.0	
Conservative win (new seat)				

=== Upper Willingdon ===
Upper Willingdon
Party	Candidate	Votes	%	±%
Independent	Raymond Shing	644	56.2	
Conservative	Douglas Murray	367	32.0	
Liberal Democrats	Cynthia Dewick	135	11.8	
Majority				
Turnout		1,166	41.9	
Registered electors		2,785		
Rejected ballots		20	1.7	
Independent win (new seat)				

=== Withyham ===
Withyham
Party	Candidate	Votes	%	±%
Green	Keith Obbard	499	52.7	
Conservative	Virginia Best	448	47.3	
Majority				
Turnout		960	39.4	
Registered electors		2,435		
Rejected ballots		13	1.4	
Green win (new seat)				

== Changes 2019–2023 ==
 * 2020: Kay Moss, councillor for Crowborough North, left the Conservative Party and sat as an independent councillor.[6][7]
 * 2021: Lin Clark, councillor for Pevensey Bay, left the Conservative Party and sat as an independent councillor.[8][9]

=== By-elections ===
==== Hailsham North by-election ====
The vacancy affected the seat held at the 2019 election by Conservative councillor Nicholas Collinson.

Hailsham North: 6 May 2021
Party	Candidate	Votes	%	±%
Liberal Democrats	Paul Holbrook	360	40.5	+11.6
Conservative	Chris Bryant	293	33.0	−1.0
Independent	David Radtke	152	17.1	
Green	Rachel Chilton	66	7.4	−14.1
SDP	Malcolm Richards	17	1.9	
Majority		67	7.5	
Turnout		899	34.4	
Registered electors		2,611		
Rejected ballots		11	1.2	
Liberal Democrats gain from Conservative		Swing	▲12.6	

==== Hailsham South by-election ====
The by-election followed the death of Conservative councillor Chriss Triandafyllou.

Hailsham South: 6 May 2021
Party	Candidate	Votes	%	±%
Conservative	Kevin Balsdon	411	45.2	−1.4
Liberal Democrats	Anne Blake-Coggins	332	36.5	+7.7
Independent	Laurence Keeley	90	9.9	
Green	Simon Wells	77	8.5	
Majority		79	8.7	
Turnout		920	32.0	
Registered electors		2,873		
Rejected ballots		9	1.0	
Conservative hold		Swing	▼9.1	

==== Heathfield North by-election ====
The vacancy affected the seat held at the 2019 election by Conservative councillor Richard Angel.

Heathfield North: 6 May 2021
Party	Candidate	Votes	%	±%
Conservative	Mike Baker	733	62.1	+2.2
Green	Scott Candogan	268	22.7	
Labour	David Newman	179	15.2	+0.3
Majority		465	39.4	
Turnout		1,197	36.5	
Registered electors		3,281		
Rejected ballots		16	1.3	
Conservative hold		Swing	▲4.7	

==== Heathfield South by-election ====
The by-election followed the resignation of Conservative councillor John "Roger" Thomas, who stood down on 1 July 2020 at the age of 79 due to medical reasons; the resulting by-election was delayed until 2021 because of the COVID-19 pandemic.

Heathfield South: 6 May 2021
Party	Candidate	Votes	%	±%
Conservative	Tom Guyton-Day	661	60.0	−8.4
Independent	Kevin Benton	441	40.0	
Majority		220	20.0	
Turnout		1,118	36.7	
Registered electors		3,048		
Rejected ballots		16	1.4	
Conservative hold		Swing	▼16.8	

==== Hartfield by-election ====
The by-election followed the death of Conservative councillor Chris Hardy in September 2021.

Hartfield: 2 December 2021
Party	Candidate	Votes	%	±%
Green	Rachel Millward	589	55.8	+12.7
Conservative	Bruce Rainbow	467	44.2	−12.7
Majority		122	11.6	
Turnout		1,061	36.7	
Green gain from Conservative		Swing	▲25.4	
Registered electors		2,894		
Rejected ballots		5	0.5	

==== Hailsham South by-election ====
The by-election followed the resignation of Conservative councillor Kevin Balsdon.

Hailsham South: 10 February 2022
Party	Candidate	Votes	%	±%
Liberal Democrats	Anne Blake-Coggins	394	59.7	+30.9
Conservative	Christopher Bryant	254	38.5	−8.1
SDP	Stephen Gander	12	1.8	N/A
Majority		140	21.2	
Turnout		660	23.0	
Registered electors		2,871		
Rejected ballots		0	0.0	
Liberal Democrats gain from Conservative		Swing	▲19.5	

==== Maresfield by-election ====
The by-election followed the resignation of Conservative councillor Peter Roundell.

Maresfield: 22 September 2022
Party	Candidate	Votes	%	±%
Green	Ian Tysh	651	61.2	+30.3
Conservative	Helen Galley	412	38.8	−23.2
Majority		239	22.4	
Turnout		1,067	35.7	
Registered electors		2,986		
Rejected ballots		4	0.4	
Green gain from Conservative		Swing		
