= 1999 Wealden District Council election =

1999 UK local government election

The 1999 Wealden District Council election took place on 6 May 1999 to elect members of Wealden District Council in East Sussex, England. The whole council was up for election and the Conservative Party stayed in overall control of the council.

== Election result ==
Overall turnout at the election was 33.5%.

Wealden local election result 1999
Party	Seats	Gains	Losses	Net gain/loss	Seats %	Votes %	Votes	+/−
Conservative	34			+3	58.6			
Liberal Democrats	22			-1	37.9			
Independent	2			-2	3.4			

== By-elections between 1999 and 2003 ==
=== Heathfield ===
Heathfield By-Election 7 June 2001
Party	Candidate	Votes	%	±%
Conservative		1,966	56.0	+4.2
Liberal Democrats		1,259	35.9	+1.8
Independent		284	8.1	+8.1
Majority		707	20.1	
Turnout		3,509		
Conservative hold		Swing		

=== Uckfield (2 seats) ===
A by-election was held in Uckfield on 29 November 2001 for 2 seats on the council, following the 2 Liberal Democrat councillors, Mike and Gill Skinner, resigning from the council in September after moving from the county. The Conservatives gained both seats, with the wife of the chairman of the council, Silvia Buck, being one of the successful candidates.

Uckfield By-Election 29 November 2001 (2)
Party	Candidate	Votes	%	±%
Conservative	Geoffrey Sampson	702		
Conservative	Silvia Buck	685		
Liberal Democrats	Anthony Parker	551		
Liberal Democrats	Michael Hakiel	547		
Labour	Duncan Bennett	284		
Labour	Ian Smith	244		
Turnout		3,013	14.4	
Conservative gain from Liberal Democrats		Swing		
Conservative gain from Liberal Democrats		Swing		

=== Herstmonceux ===
A by-election was held in Herstmonceux on 4 April 2002 after the death of Conservative councillor Brian Jarman. Conservative Andrew Long held the seat for the party with a majority of 202.

Herstmonceux By-Election 4 April 2002
Party	Candidate	Votes	%	±%
Conservative	Andrew Long	596	60.2	−3.8
Liberal Democrats	Graham Love	394	39.8	+3.8
Majority		202	20.4	
Turnout		990	30.7	
Conservative hold		Swing		

=== Uckfield ===
A by-election was held in Uckfield on 27 June 2002 for one of the two seats that had been previously contested in a by-election in November 2001, as Conservative councillor Geoffrey Sampson resigned from the council in May 2002 after a controversial article on racism. The Liberal Democrats gained the seat back from the Conservatives.

Uckfield By-Election 27 June 2002
Party	Candidate	Votes	%	±%
Liberal Democrats	Anthony Parker	1,162	47.8	+7.3
Conservative	Stanley French	914	37.6	+8.7
Labour	Duncan Bennett	356	14.6	−0.2
Majority		248	10.2	
Turnout		2,432	22.9	
Liberal Democrats gain from Conservative		Swing		
