= Crowborough =

Town in East Sussex, England

Coordinates: 51°04′N 0°10′E

- Town and civil parish
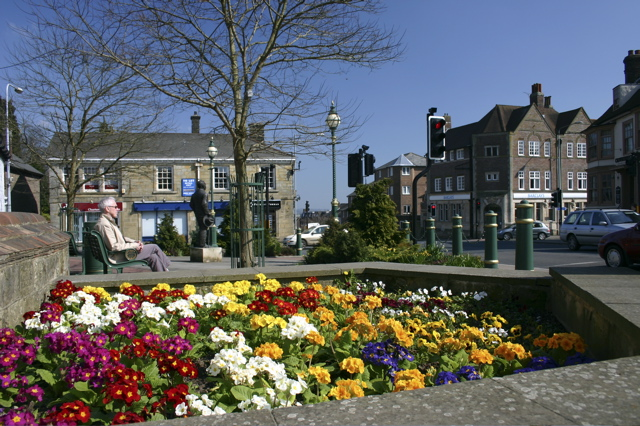
- Crowborough Cross, 2007

- Location within East Sussex
- Area: 13.6 km^{2} (5.3 sq mi)
- Population: 21,688
  - Density: 3,812/sq mi (1,472/km^{2})
- OS grid reference: TQ518312
  - London: 33 miles (53 km) NNW
- District: Wealden
- Shire county: East Sussex
- Region: South East
- Country: England
- Sovereign state: United Kingdom
- Post town: CROWBOROUGH
- Postcode district: TN6
- Dialling code: 01892
- Police: Sussex
- Fire: East Sussex
- Ambulance: South East Coast
- UK Parliament: Sussex Weald
- Website: Crowborough Town Council

Crowborough is a town and civil parish in East Sussex, England, in the Weald at the edge of Ashdown Forest and the highest town in the High Weald Area of Outstanding Natural Beauty.

It is located 7 miles (11 km) south-west of Royal Tunbridge Wells and 33 miles (53 km) south of London. It had a population of 21,688 at the 2021 Census, making it the second largest town in inland East Sussex after Hailsham.

The highest point in the town is 242 m (794 ft) above sea level, making it the second highest point in East Sussex after Ditchling Beacon.

== History ==
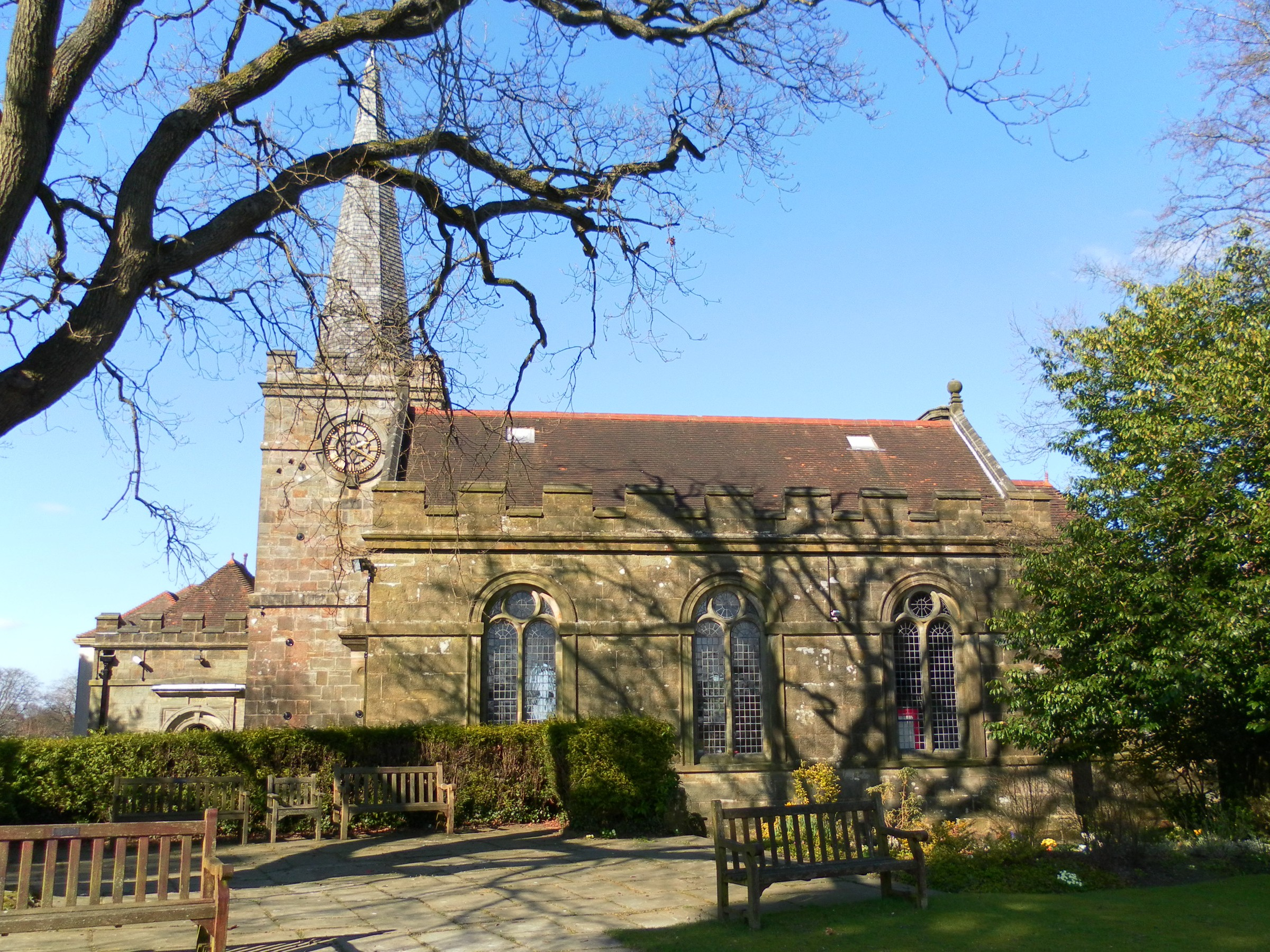
All Saints' Church

The town's name means "hill or mound frequented by crows", from the Old English crāwe + beorg. The name Crowborough is first seen c. 1346 as a clearance near the village of Rotherfield.

In 1734, Sir Henry Fermor, a local benefactor, bequeathed money for a church and charity school for the benefit of the "very ignorant and heathenish people" that lived in the part of Rotherfield "in or near a place called Crowborough and Ashdown Forest". The church, dedicated to All Saints, and primary school still survive today.

The railway arrived in 1868, leading to significant growth of the town. By 1880, the town had grown so much that the ecclesiastical parish of All Saints was separated from that of St Denys, Rotherfield.

In the late 19th century, Crowborough was promoted as a health resort based on its high elevation, the rolling hills and surrounding forest. Estate agents even called it "Scotland in Sussex". The town's golf course opened in 1895, followed by a fire station and hospital in 1900.

From 1942 to 1982, a site near Crowborough hosted notable radio transmitters, including the Aspidistra transmitter during World War II and, after the war, the BBC External Service broadcasts to Europe transmitters.

== Governance ==
Crowborough became an ecclesiastical parish in 1880: previously it had been part of Rotherfield. A civil parish was established on 6 April 1905; the parish council was renamed as a Town Council on 24 May 1988.

Until 2012, Crowborough shared the headquarters of Wealden District Council with Hailsham, 14 miles (22 km) to the south. The Council moved all of their operations to Hailsham in 2012 although East Sussex County Council still operates a library service from the Pine Grove building. In July 2014, the Crowborough Community Association put in a bid to buy Pine Grove to retain the library and develop the rest of the building as an "enterprise hub".

=== Parliament ===
In the House of Commons, Crowborough is in the Sussex Weald constituency, represented by Conservative Nus Ghani, one of the Deputy Speakers of the House of Commons. Former MPs include Charles Hendry (2001–2015), and Sir Geoffrey Johnson-Smith (1965–2001).

== Geography ==
Crowborough

Highest point
- Elevation: 242 m (794 ft)
- Prominence: c. 159 m
- Parent peak: Leith Hill
- Listing: Marilyn

Geography
- Location: High Weald, England
- OS grid: TQ510305
- Topo map: OS Landranger 188

Crowborough is located in the northern part of East Sussex, around 6 kilometres (4 miles) from the county border with Kent. The town is 57 kilometres (35 miles) south of central London. The nearest major towns are Royal Tunbridge Wells, 12 kilometres (7 miles) to the north-east; Brighton, 34 kilometres (21 miles) to the south-west; and Crawley, 26 kilometres (16 miles) to the west. The county town of Lewes is 24 kilometres (15 miles) to the south-west.

The town is located on the eastern edge of the Ashdown Forest, an ancient area of open heathland which is protected for its ecological importance and was the setting for A. A. Milne's stories about Winnie-the-Pooh.

The highest point in the town is 242 m (794 ft) above sea level. This summit is the highest point of the High Weald and second highest point in East Sussex (the highest is Ditchling Beacon). Its relative height is 159 m (522 ft), meaning Crowborough qualifies as one of England's Marilyns. The summit is not marked on the ground.

The town has grown from a series of previously separate villages and hamlets including Jarvis Brook, Poundfield, Whitehill, Stone Cross, Alderbrook, Sweet Haws, St Johns and Steel Cross.

== Demographics ==
As of 2021, Crowborough is mostly white - 95.5% of the town is white and other minorities include Asian (1.7%), Black (0.5%) and other (2.3%) which include, mixed. In terms of gender, Crowborough has a 51.2% female to 48.8% male demographic. In terms of religion, the two largest beliefs are Christianity and no religion.

Religion in Crowborough (2021):
1. Christianity (53.7%)
2. No religion (42.5%)
3. Islam (0.70%)
4. Hinduism (0.30%)
5. Judaism (0.20%)
6. Sikhism (0.03%)
7. Buddhism (0.40%)
8. Other religions (2.20%)

== Transport ==
The main road in Crowborough is the A26. From Crowborough, the A26 runs north-east to Maidstone via Tunbridge Wells and Tonbridge and ends at the A20 gyratory. To the south, it runs to Newhaven, via Uckfield and Lewes.

Two B roads run through the town. The B2100 starts at the junction with the A26 (Crowborough Cross) and runs east to Lamberhurst via Jarvis Brook, Rotherfield, Mark Cross and Wadhurst. The B2157 Green Lane is a short link between Steel Cross and Crowborough Hill, within the town.

Crowborough railway station is located in Jarvis Brook at the bottom of Crowborough Hill. Trains run on the Oxted line which is operated by Southern, providing a direct link with London Bridge, East Croydon, Edenbridge Town and Uckfield. The journey time to London Bridge is approximately one hour.

The Brighton & Hove Buses Regency Route 29 runs every half-hour (Mon-Sat) or hourly (Sundays/public holiday) to/from Brighton and Tunbridge Wells via Lewes, Uckfield and Crowborough.

== Education ==
Crowborough has one secondary school, Beacon Academy, and seven primary schools:

- Ashdown Primary School, formed from the merging of Whitehill Infant School and Herne Junior School in September 2015.
- High Hurstwood Church of England (controlled) School
- Jarvis Brook Primary School
- St Johns Church of England (aided) School
- St Mary's Roman Catholic School
- Sir Henry Fermor Church of England School
- Acre Wood Academy

In addition there are two independent preparatory schools.

== Media ==
The local paper is the Kent and Sussex Courier published in Tunbridge Wells. Owned by the regional newspaper publisher Local World, there are six editions of the paper including a Sussex edition. Local television news programmes are BBC South East Today and ITV Meridian. In 2014 a local news website (Hyperlocal) called CrowboroughLife.com was established by Stephan Butler. Local radio stations are BBC Radio Sussex on 104.5 FM, Heart South on 102.4 FM and Ashdown Radio on 94.7 FM.

== Health ==
Crowborough War Memorial Hospital on Southview Road is a small NHS hospital with minor injury unit and midwife-led maternity unit. Opening hours are Monday to Sunday, 8am to 8pm.

It has been threatened with closure numerous times, but services are still offered, in part due to a strong local campaign. Non-maternity services are provided at hospitals in Pembury and Haywards Heath.

== Sport and leisure ==
=== Sports teams and associations ===
The town's football clubs comprise Crowborough Athletic F.C., who are based at the Crowborough Community Stadium and currently play in Isthmian League South East and Jarvis Brook F.C., founded in 1888, run four senior sides, the highest of which plays in the Southern Combination Division 2.

Crowborough Rugby Football Club, located in the Steel Cross area, was established in 1936. The 1st XV currently competes in London & SE Counties 1 Kent. CRFC runs minis from U6s to U11s; juniors from U12s to U18s; girls from U12s to U18s; plus women's, 2nd XV/3rd XV/Vets sides. There is walking rugby on Thursday evenings and touch rugby in summer.

Crowborough Runners is an England Athletics-affiliated club based at Goldsmiths Recreation Ground, where there is a three-lane, all-weather floodlit track. The club hosts coach-led track sessions at 6.30pm on Monday, Tuesday and Wednesday. A year-round club run takes place at 7pm Wednesday evening from Goldsmiths' Leisure Centre car park. For juniors aged 8+, there is a Saturday morning track session at 9.45am.

Crowborough Cricket Club has two teams playing in the Sussex Cricket League. Their home ground is Wolfe Recreation Ground on Blackness Road.

Crowborough Tennis and Squash Club has seven floodlit tennis courts, four squash courts, two padel courts, two outdoor Pickleballs Courts as well as a dedicated Mini-Tennis court. The club also offers racketball and table-tennis. The club competes in the Sussex County leagues in both tennis and squash as well as within the Weald and Horam leagues for tennis. The club is open to the public for Pay and Play tennis, padel, pickleball, squash, table tennis and racketball. There are also a host of social events from quizzes to live music.

Crowborough Beacon Golf Club was founded in 1895. Sir Arthur Conan Doyle, who was elected Captain of the club in 1910, penned Sherlock Holmes tales while looking out of his study window at the club.

Crowborough Hockey Club is a field hockey club that competes in the South East Hockey League.

Crowborough Netball is a coaching club formed, with help from Crowborough Town Council, in 2013. The club coaches children and adults from those new to the game to league players at Crowborough Leisure Centre, Beacon Academy's Green Lane Gym, and Goldsmiths outdoor court. The club arranges friendly, fun matches and competitions for all ages.

Crowborough Training Camp is host to a detachment of the Army Cadet Force, a national organisation sponsored by the MoD for youths aged between 12 and 18. 1st Crowborough Scout Group comprises 1 Squirrels, 3 Beavers, 3 Cubs and 3 Scouts sections.

In January 2026 the training camp became the centre of large scale protests following the Home Office's decision to use it as temporary accommodation for asylum seekers.

=== Recreation ===
Crowborough has several recreation grounds, including Goldsmiths Recreation Ground, which was given to the parish by private owners in 1937. The town council has since purchased additional land and has developed the ground into a recreation centre. There are a sports centre with swimming pool; a boating lake; and a miniature railway.

Crowborough Common is an ancient common covering over 220 acres, or about 90 hectares, to which the public was granted a legal right of access "for the taking of air and exercise" in 1936. The common is owned by Crowborough Beacon Golf Club. Most of the common is heathland and woodland. In 2012 Wealden District Council refused permission for the golf club to build a new car park in woodland on the common after a campaign involving local residents and organisations including the Open Spaces Society. On 1 February 2013 the Club served notice to DEFRA to revoke the Section 193 agreement which governed the public's right of access on the Common. On 7 February 2013 DEFRA confirmed the revocation of the rights. Due to Health and Safety reasons, not least of which is the outcome of a court case known as the 'Nidry Castle' case members of the public are requested to keep to official public footpaths and bridleways to mitigate the possible incidence of accident and injury. The club however are in consultation with Wealden District Council and other interested parties to endeavor to relocate some footpaths to make it safer for members of the public who use such footpaths. In addition, to give better access to the common for members of the public, the club are looking at ways of introducing some permissive pathways to give access to areas not served by public footpaths. The club, with the assistance of Natural England, have embarked upon a 10-year programme to restore as much of the common as possible to heathland so this endangered environment will be preserved for future generations. Adjacent to the fourth fairway is a memorial to nine Canadian soldiers of the Lincoln and Welland Regiment who were killed by a flying bomb on 5 July 1944.

Crowborough Country Park is a 16-acre (6 hectare) nature reserve located in the southern part of Crowborough. The park was previously a clay quarry serving the Crowborough Brickworks which closed in 1980. The topography of the site is evidence of its industrial past. The site of the brickworks was developed into Farningham Road industrial estate and housing in the area of Osborne Road. For nearly 30 years the quarry was left to natural regeneration and local people used it for informal play, with stories of swimming in the ponds and losing Wellington boots in the wet areas of the site. In 2008 Crowborough Town Council acquired the site to develop it for informal recreation and also to enhance the site's biodiversity. In 2008 work began in the Country Park, with a stone track and bridges installed. The site was declared a Local Nature Reserve in 2009 ensuring the future management of the site for the benefit of the wildlife and for people to enjoy quiet recreation.

The Crowborough Players, established in 1933, are the resident community drama group at the 300-seater hall at Crowborough Community Centre which opened in June 2012.

== Notable people ==
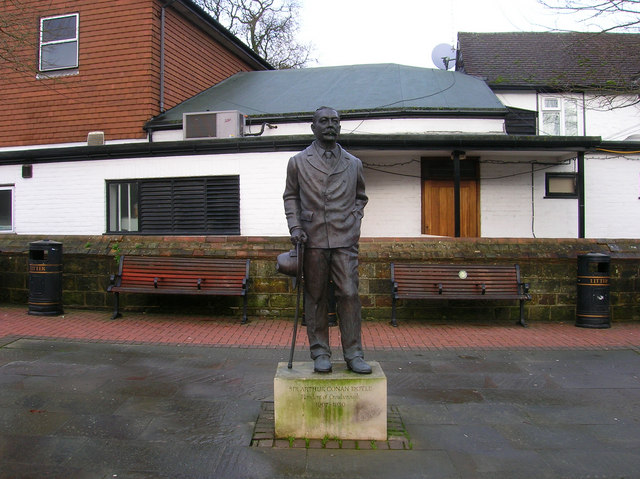
The statue of Sir Arthur Conan Doyle at Crowborough Cross

Sir Arthur Conan Doyle (1859–1930), the author of the Sherlock Holmes novels and short stories, lived at Windlesham Manor in Crowborough for the last 23 years of his life.

He moved to Crowborough from Surrey in 1907 when he married his second wife, whose family lived next door at Little Windlesham. Windlesham Manor is now a retirement home.

Sir Arthur was a past Captain of Crowborough Beacon Golf Club in 1910 and Lady Conan Doyle was Ladies Captain in 1911.

Conan Doyle was initially buried vertically in the grounds of the manor, but later interred with his first wife at Minstead in the New Forest. His statue stands at Crowborough Cross, in the town centre.

A Sherlock Holmes festival was held in Crowborough for several years running in the mid-1990s, reportedly attracting up to 25,000 visitors.

Conan Doyle is commemorated in the town through street names such as Watson Way and Sherlock Shaw, and Conan Way.

Other notable Crowborough people include:

- Tom Baker (born 1934), actor, played the role of the fourth Doctor in Doctor Who and Sherlock Holmes in the 1982 British four-part television serial The Hound of the Baskervilles based on the Conan Doyle story of the same name.
- Dirk Bogarde (1921–1999), actor and writer
- Robert Henry Cain, (1909–1974), only survivor of the Battle of Arnhem to receive the Victoria Cross
- James Dagwell (born 1974), British journalist, former BBC News presenter
- Tom Driberg, Baron Bradwell (1905–1976), journalist, politician, member of the British Communist Party
- Sir E. E. Evans-Pritchard, social anthropologist
- Dylan Hartley, England rugby union player
- David Jason (born 1940), actor
- Richard Jefferies (1848–1887), writer and naturalist
- Jehst (William Shields) (born 1979), hip hop artist
- Kerry Katona, actor and singer
- Ross Kemp, actor, played Grant Mitchell in the soap opera EastEnders
- Derek Rayner, Baron Rayner, former CEO of the Marks & Spencer department store chain
- Isaac Roberts (1829–1904), engineer, pioneer in astrophotography of nebulae
- Piers Sellers (1955–2016), NASA astronaut
- Tony Stratton Smith, manager of the rock bands Genesis and Van der Graaf Generator
- Norman Thorne (c. 1902 – 1925), chicken farmer convicted of the Crowborough "Chicken run murder"
- Sir Tim Waterstone, founder of Waterstones bookshop chain
- Kim Woodburn, television presenter
- Cate Blanchett, Academy Award-winning Australian actress
- Kevin Brownlow, filmmaker and film historian
- Kirsty Barton, Brighton & Hove Albion footballer
- Matt Weston, Olympic skeleton racer
- Joanne Rout, Paralympic swimmer
- Hugh Beaver, founder of the Guinness Book of Records
- Kim Philby, Soviet spy

== Local traditions ==
A main event in the town's calendar is its annual celebration of Guy Fawkes Night on 5 November. An average of 5000 people descend upon Goldsmiths Recreation Ground for this town council event. Donations on the night are traditionally collected by the local Lions Club and now also the Rotary Club, and donated to the mayor's charity.

However this is overshadowed by carnival night, which sees the whole of the town taking to the streets on the second Saturday in September. This is run by the town's Bonfire and Carnival Society. It involves a fête on Chapel green during the day, followed by a torchlight parade led by the carnival princess in the evening, with various Sussex bonfire societies joining the march round the streets. The evening culminates in a bonfire on Chapel Green or sometimes there have been fireworks at Goldsmiths Recreation Ground. Street collections are received on the night and are given to around six different local charities each year. On average the society raises about £2,000–£3,000 per year. This tradition dates back around 70 years and is part of Sussex Bonfire Tradition the largest event of which being the Lewes Bonfire celebrations on 5 November.

The town council also puts on a summer fair and a Christmas fair. A summer fun day is organised by the Crowborough Chamber of Commerce, and Crowborough Hospital has a fête every August Bank Holiday.

There is a farmers' market on the fourth Saturday of the month. and a French Market held as part of the Chamber of Commerce's Fun Day in June. As well as this for the last few years Sussex day has been celebrated on 16 June with a small fete in Chapel Green

According to local legend, Walshes Road is haunted by a bag of soot. The spectral bag pursues people walking along the road by night.

== Twin towns ==
The town is twinned with:

- Montargis, France
- Horwich, Greater Manchester, England

On 22 April 1990, Crowborough and Horwich became the first towns in England to be twinned with other English towns.

== See also ==
- List of current places of worship in Wealden
- List of former places of worship in Wealden
- Luxford House
