= Zoar Strict Baptist Chapel =

Historic Baptist church in Sussex, England

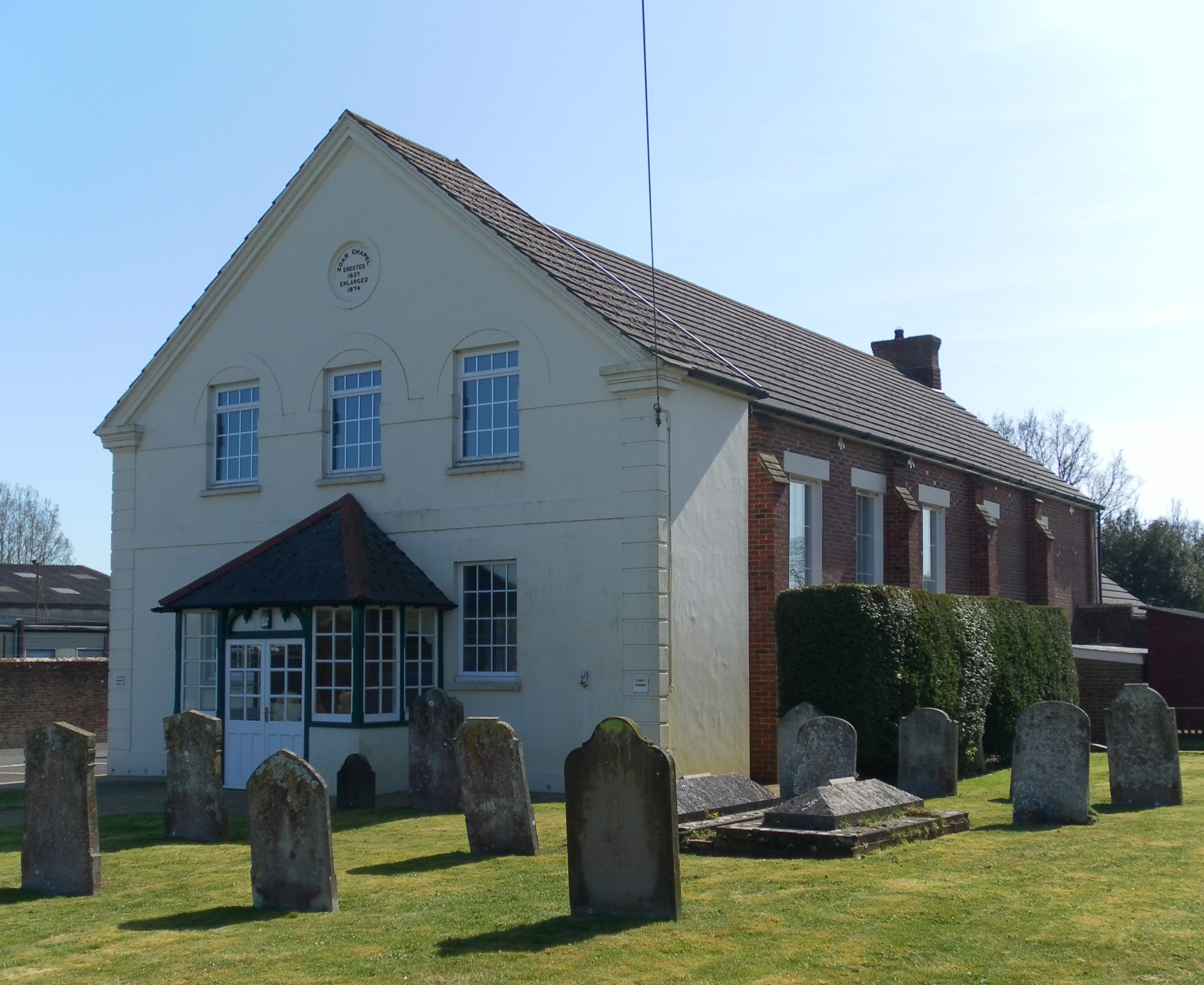
- The chapel from the northwest
- Zoar Strict Baptist Chapel
- 50.8790°N 0.2270°E
- Location: A22, Lower Dicker, near Hailsham, East Sussex BN27 4AT
- Country: England
- Denomination: Baptist
- Tradition: Strict Baptist

History
- Former name: The Dicker Chapel
- Status: Chapel
- Founded: 1837
- Founder: William Cowper

Architecture
- Functional status: Active
- Style: Classical/Georgian
- Groundbreaking: 1837
- Completed: 1838
- Construction cost: £422

Zoar Strict Baptist Chapel is a Strict Baptist place of worship in the hamlet of Lower Dicker in the English county of East Sussex. Founded in 1837 and originally known as The Dicker Chapel, the "large and impressive" Classical/Georgian-style building stands back from a main road in a rural part of East Sussex. The 800-capacity building included a schoolroom and stables when built, and various links exist between people and pastors associated with the chapel and other Strict Baptist and Calvinistic causes in the county, which is "particularly well endowed with [such] chapels".

The chapel was built in 1837–38 and substantially extended in 1874. It has its own burial ground, extended in 1880. After a brief attempt by the first pastor to run the chapel along mixed denominational lines—serving Strict Baptist and Calvinistic Independent worshippers—it assumed a solely Strict Baptist identity, which it retains as of 2026. Six permanent pastors have administered the chapel during its existence: one served for more than 50 years.

== History ==
The name Dicker originally described a large area of land near the River Cuckmere and South Downs, several miles inland from the English Channel. No reference to Dicker was made in the Domesday Book of 1086, and much of the area was unenclosed common land. It was crossed by a highway (the present A22), south of which was a major religious house, Michelham Priory. This gradually declined and was abandoned at the Dissolution of the Monasteries in 1536. The scattered settlements at Lower Dicker and Upper Dicker developed slowly and only gained their present names in the 18th century.

Lower Dicker is now a linear settlement along the A22, but in the early 19th century little existed at the "lower end of the Diccar ... in Hellingly Parish" other than a brickworks. There were a few farms on the common land, though, and many of their occupants were Nonconformists rather than followers of the Church of England. The latter was the Established Church in England, and various Acts of Parliament put restrictions on worship at places other than its own churches; but these were gradually relaxed, and by the 18th century many new Christian denominations had emerged, all categorised under the general name "Nonconformist". Such denominations were particularly strong in rural parts of East Sussex, and Calvinistic beliefs were especially popular. Meetings were commonly held in houses, barns or similar buildings, and groups were generally aligned to either the Independent movement or a Calvinistic interpretation of Baptist beliefs. (The term "Strict Baptist" to describe such views developed in the 19th century "with the purpose of organising a range of Calvinistic Baptist causes within a denominational identity".)

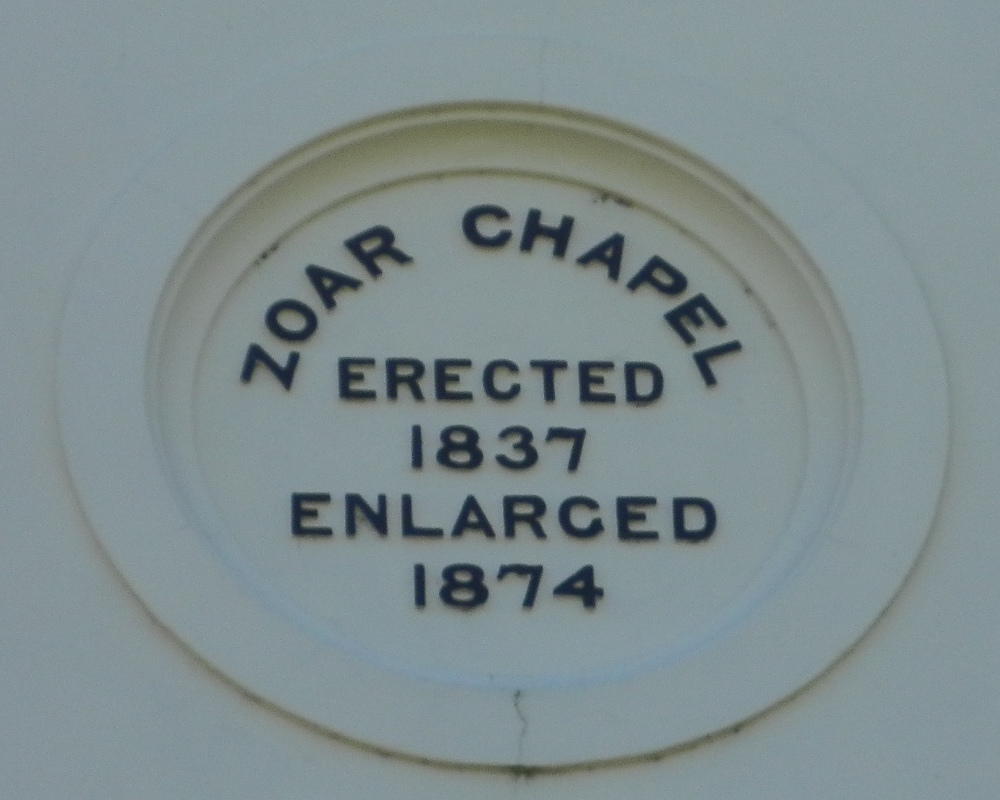
A recessed roundel in the pediment shows the dates of construction and enlargement.

Several small-scale meetings of Calvinistic pastors and worshippers took place in the Dicker area from the late 18th century: in barns, houses and above an ironmonger's shop near the brickworks. In 1812, a permanent chapel was founded by James Dunk for the Vinalls, father-and-son preachers who were well known at the time in East Sussex. Dunk's Chapel, later known as Little Dicker Chapel and now as Golden Cross Chapel, was completed and licensed in 1813. The red-brick building was set back from the main road and was described from the start as a "Calvinistic Independent" chapel. The cause was popular, and the building was soon too small to accommodate worshippers who regularly travelled from a long distance; so in 1837 the trustees of Dunk's Chapel paid £20 for some land further along the main road next to the brickworks and spent £422 on a "large and comfortable" new building with a capacity of 400 worshippers. It was opened in 1838 by William Gadsby, and local resident William Cowper (at whose house worship had taken place before Dunk's Chapel was built) was installed as the first pastor.

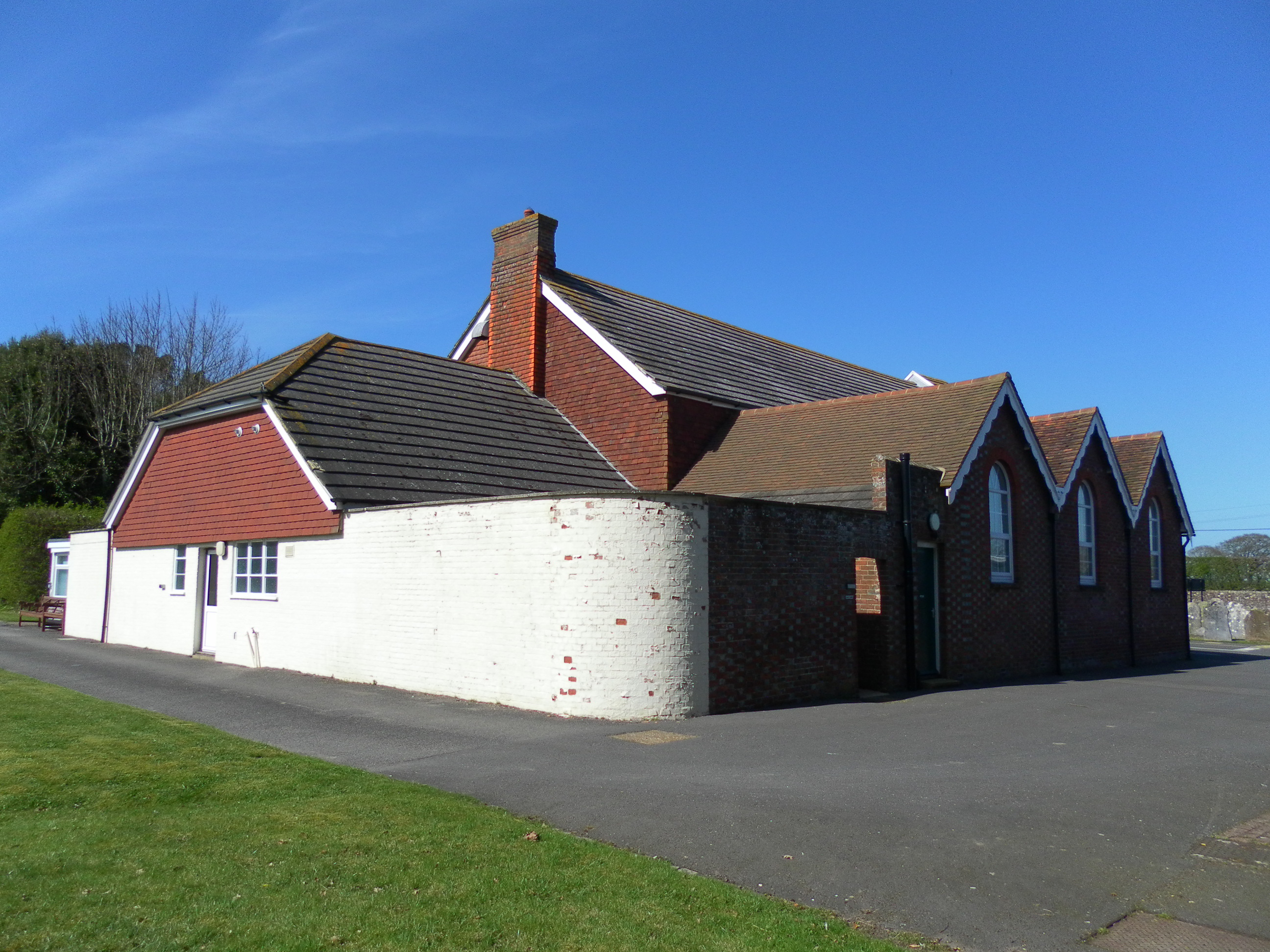
The chapel was extended to the side and rear in 1874.

The chapel was initially constituted for a mixed congregation, serving both Calvinistic Baptists and Independents. This did not work, and it was reconstituted solely as a Strict Baptist church in 1839. Thereafter, the cause was successful: the religious census carried out across England in March 1851 found that 320 worshippers attended on census day. In 1864, during the pastorate of George Drake, the chapel became aligned to the Gospel Standard tradition, which emerged in the late 1850s following a schism in Strict Baptist theology. The Gospel Standard movement was associated with the magazine of that name, first published in 1835. Zoar Chapel maintains this alignment as of 2026.

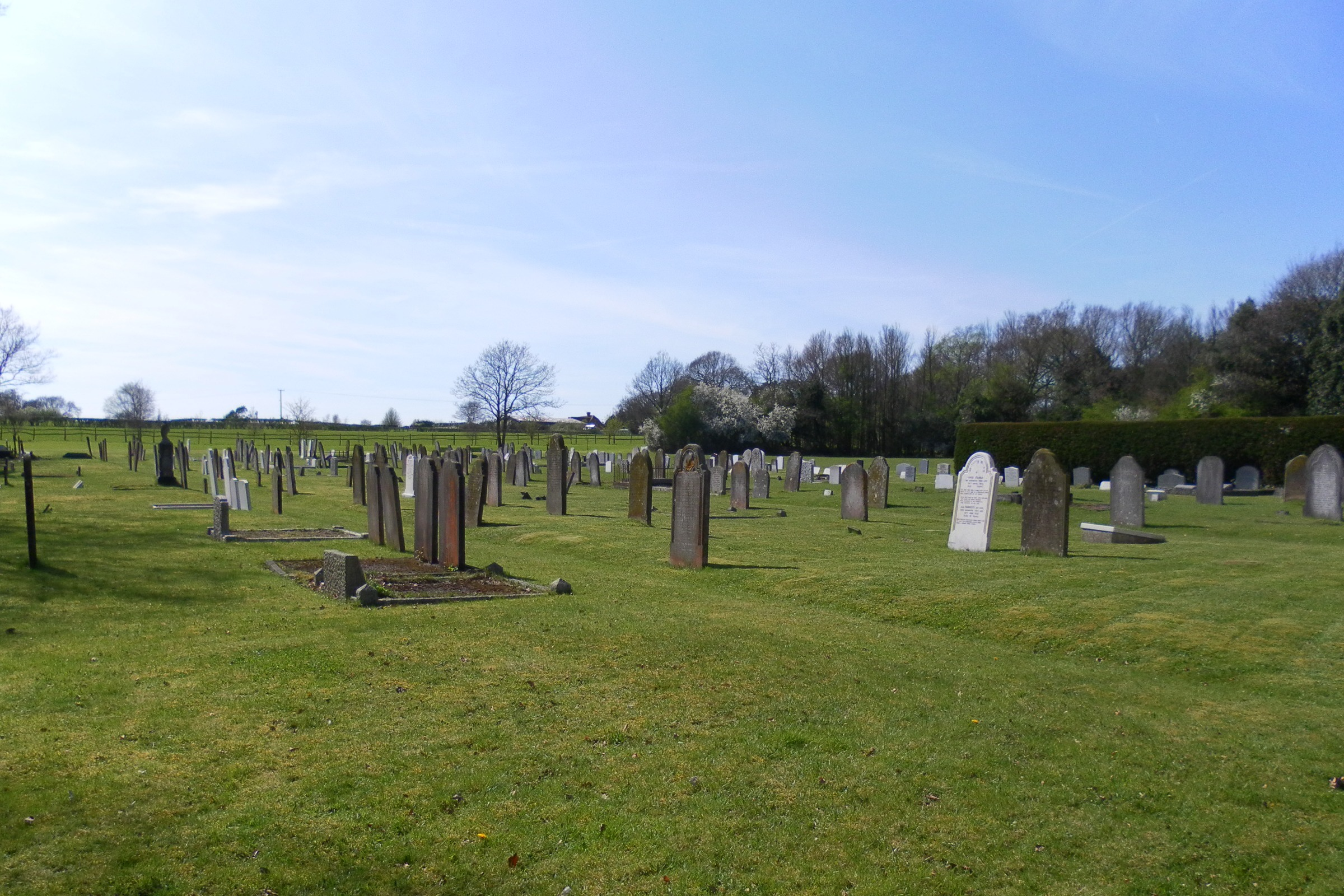
The chapel's burial ground was extended in 1880.

The cause was prosperous and relatively wealthy compared to other Strict Baptist chapels, and to cater for the large number of worshippers the building was extended in 1874 at a cost of £600. Worshippers came from many miles around, as was common in rural areas, and the chapel was built with stabling for 40 horses and carts for the benefit of those who rode to Lower Dicker. These facilities were erected before 1875 and consisted of "a long brick-and-tile building". A terrace of houses called Chapel Cottages were erected on behalf of a member of the congregation in 1875, and the small burial ground next to the chapel was enlarged to the rear in 1880.

Although the building had been completed in 1838, it was opened on 22 September 1837, and Silver Jubilee events were held on 22 September 1887. By that time the building had a capacity of 800, and nearly 1,000 people attended the Jubilee afternoon service. Between 1837 and 1990, the chapel had six permanent pastors, some of whom served for many years: John W. Sperling-Tyler, a chiropodist who was active in the Gospel Standard movement, was the incumbent for 51 years. Supply preachers served when permanent pastors were not resident.

The chapel was registered for worship under legislation in place before the Places of Worship Registration Act 1855 was passed, so although it has an entry on the General Register (under the terms of that Act of Parliament) it has been allocated the default registration number 1. It was also registered for the conduct of marriages on 4 January 1844.

A Strict Baptist chapel in the nearby hamlet of Ripe, which opened in 1830 and closed in 1948, was served from Zoar Chapel for many years. Services were held in a barn until the Hebron Calvinistic Chapel, a "quaint little" red-brick building, was completed. It was demolished soon after its closure. Stairs led from the adjacent road to the chapel, whose façade was windowless.

== Architecture ==
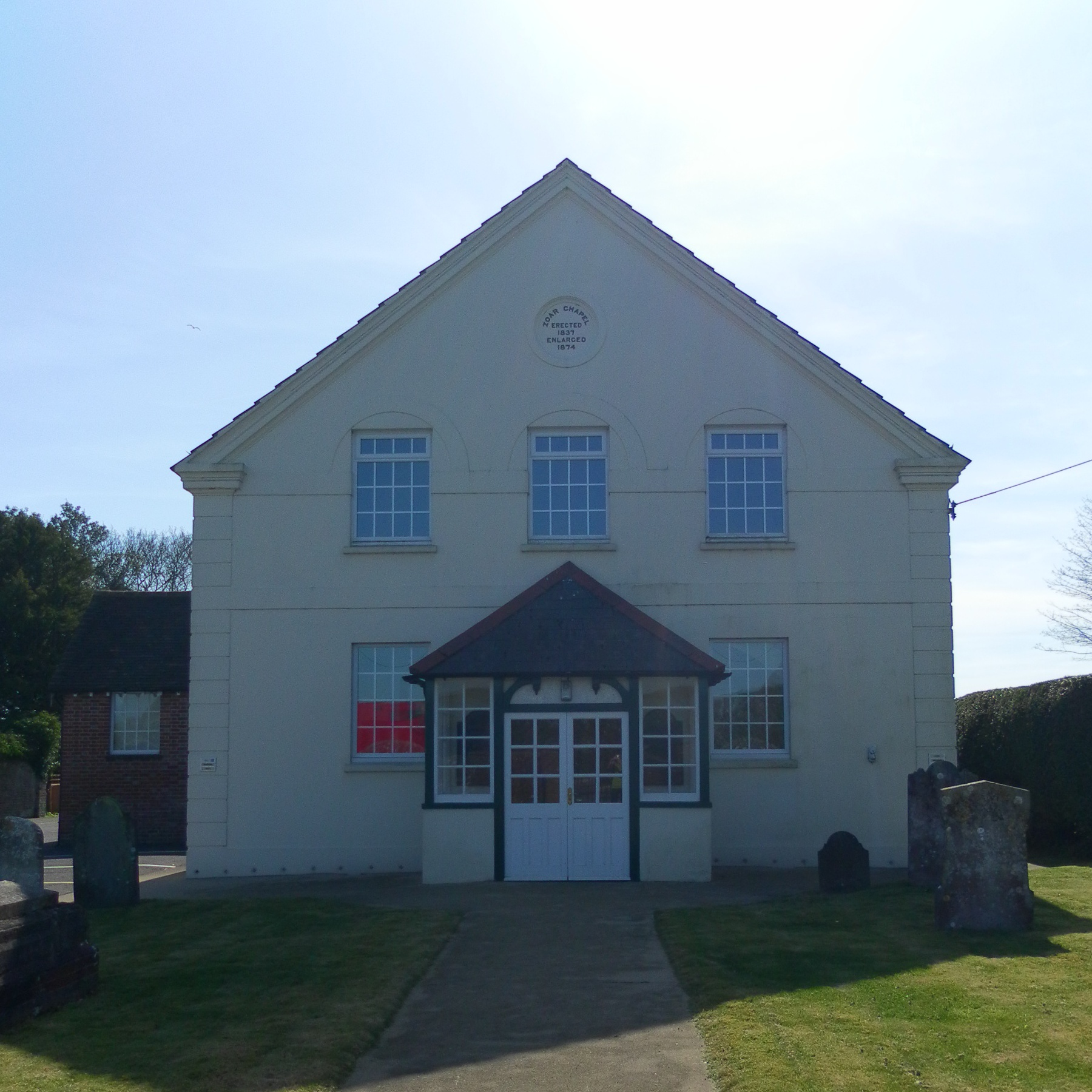
The rendered façade has pilasters and an open pediment.

Strict Baptist chapels are characteristically "modest in scale, neat in complexion and restrained" architecturally, but Zoar Chapel is unusually "large and impressive" for the denomination. Set back from the main road in a large graveyard, behind a low hedgerow and with some formally placed yew trees, it has "an atmosphere of grandeur". The building is Classical in style with some Georgian elements. The front is rendered and has a gabled roof with an open pediment in which a recessed circular plaque is inset. This gives the dates of construction (1837) and enlargement (1874). Also on the façade are pilasters and an entrance porch. All of this work dates from the 1874 enlargement. The side walls are of glazed brick laid in the Flemish bond pattern. The building incorporates a schoolroom.

== The name ==
The Biblical city of Zoar, now rendered Zoara, gives its name to the chapel and to others in neighbouring West Sussex: at Handcross (founded 1775; still Strict Baptist) and Wisborough Green (founded 1753; now Evangelical). Former chapels of that name, neither of which survived the 19th century, were at Brighton (Windsor Street) and Hastings in East Sussex. There are several others elsewhere in England.

== Links to other chapels ==
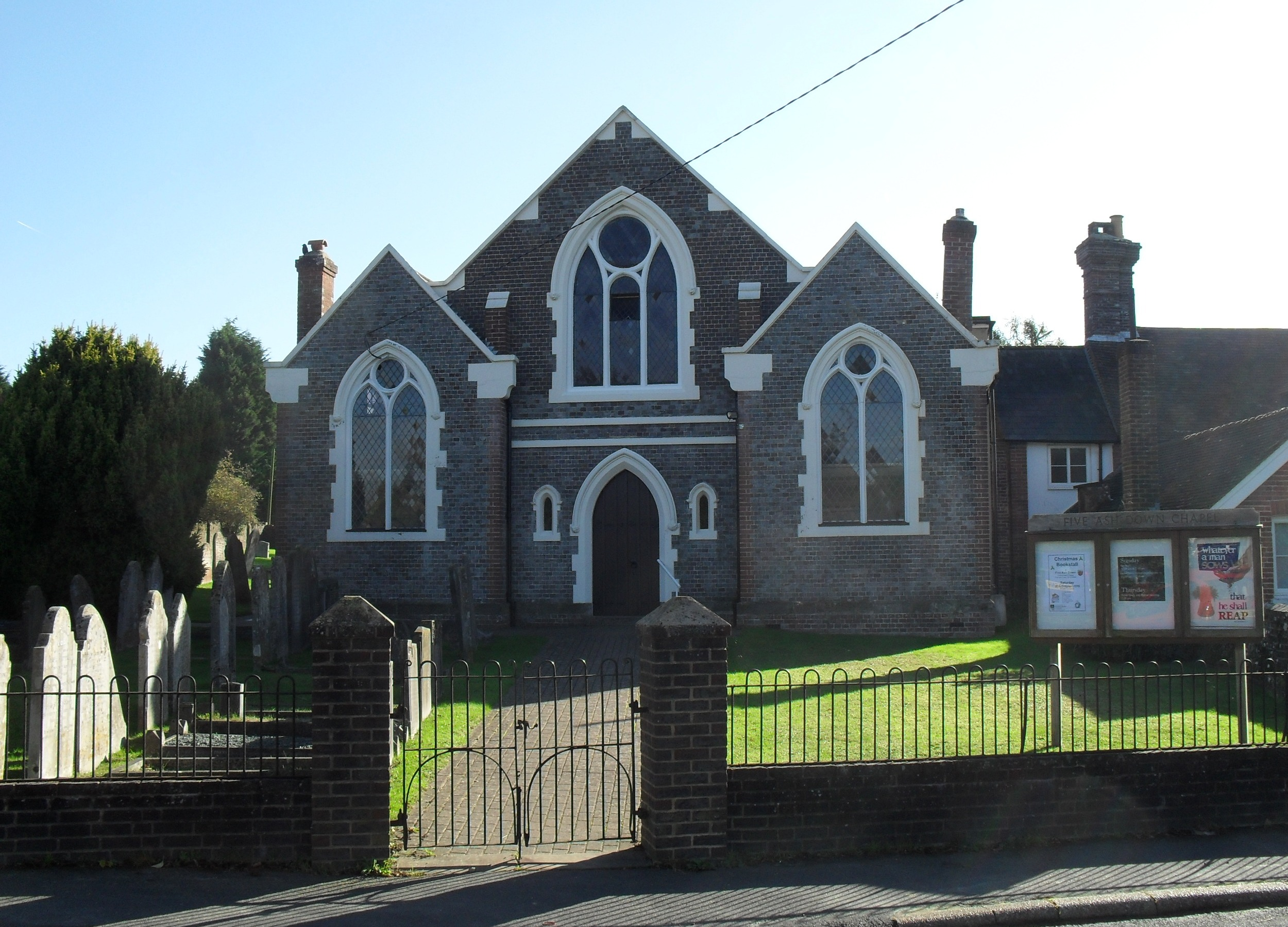
Thomas Dicker of Lower Dicker founded Five Ash Down Independent Chapel in 1784.

Several people associated with Zoar Chapel and the Dicker area have been linked to other Baptist and Calvinistic congregations in Sussex, all of which are still in existence. Members of the Dicker family lived in the district from the 13th century until the early 20th century, and it is not known whether the area is named after them or vice versa. Thomas Dicker (b. 1723) adopted Calvinist beliefs in 1773, held services at his house in Buxted and later donated land in that parish upon which Five Ash Down Independent Chapel was built in 1784. His son, also Thomas (b. 1753), joined the Bethel Strict Baptist Chapel in Wivelsfield and helped to found a Strict Baptist Chapel in Uckfield in 1789. He then became the pastor at a chapel in Hailsham. William Cowper, the first pastor of Zoar Chapel, lived at Providence Cottage in Upper Dicker; in the 1970s documents were found there which related to the ministry of James Reed of Chiddingly, a prominent Baptist preacher of the late 18th century. William Vine, the third pastor at Zoar Chapel, was previously linked to the Strict Baptist chapel in Hailsham. Ebenezer Chapel at Bodle Street Green changed from Independent to Strict Baptist in 1864 as a result of its new pastor's involvement with Zoar Chapel: originally an Independent, he was received into the Strict Baptist Church at Lower Dicker and asked for Ebenezer Chapel to realign in the same way before he accepted the pastorate.

== See also ==
- List of current places of worship in Wealden
- List of Strict Baptist churches
