= Uckfield Town Council =

Local authority in East Sussex, England

Type
- Type: Town council

Leadership
- Mayor: Councillor Jackie Love
- Deputy Mayor: Councillor Donna French

Structure
- Seats: 15
- Political groups: TRUST Independent (9); Labour Party (4); Liberal Democrats (1); Independent (1)

Elections
- Last election: 4 May 2023
- Next election: May 2027

Meeting place
- Civic Centre, Bellfarm Ln, Uckfield, East Sussex TN22 1AE.

Website
- Official website

Uckfield Town Council governs the five wards of Uckfield town. The council appoints one councillor who is then known as the Mayor of Uckfield. The current mayor of Uckfield is Councillor Jackie Love.

Uckfield Town Council comprises five wards – North, East, West, New Town, and Ridgewood – electing between two and four town councillors each.

Clockwise, from the north, it borders the communities of Maresfield, Buxted, Framfield and Little Horsted.

== Current composition ==
Group affiliation	Members
TRUST Independent	9
Labour	4
Liberal Democrats	1
Independent	1
Total	15

== Election history ==
Uckfield Town Council is composed of up to 15 councillors elected from five wards. The last elections were in 2023, and resulted in the election of 7 TRUST Independent councillors, 3 Labour councillors, 1 Liberal Democrat, and 1 Independent councillor. 3 seats were left vacant and were filled by co-option at the first Full Council meeting.

=== 2023 election ===
The 2023 Uckfield Town Council elections were due to be held alongside the elections for Wealden District Council on 4 May 2023. However, all seats were uncontested, as 3 candidates were nominated for the 3 seats in Uckfield North ward and a further 3 candidates were nominated for the 3 seats in Uckfield East ward. Only 2 candidates for 3 seats were nominated in Uckfield Ridgewood ward, 3 candidates for 4 seats were nominated in Uckfield New Town ward and 1 candidate for the 2 seats in Uckfield West ward. At the first meeting of the new Town Council, Bernadette (Ben) Reed was co-opted as a Councillor for Ridgewood ward, Peter Ullman was co-opted as a Councillor for New Town ward, and Val Frost was co-opted for West ward, filling all 15 seats on the council. Councillors Reed and Frost subsequently joined the Trust Independent group, whilst Peter Ullman joined the Labour group.

Ward	Party	Town councillors elected 2023
North	Independent	Jackie Love
North	Labour	Daniel Manvell
North	Labour	Angie Smith
East	Liberal Democrats	Michael McClafferty
East	Independent	Chris Macve
East	Independent	Donna French
New Town	Labour	Ben Cox
New Town	Independent	Spike Mayhew
New Town	Independent	Duncan Bennett
West	Independent	Diane Ward
Ridgewood	Independent	Karen Bedwell
Ridgewood	Independent	Peter Selby

=== 2019–2023 by-elections ===
By-election	Date	Incumbent party	Result	Candidate	Reason
North	7 July 2022	Independent	Labour	Daniel Manvell	Non-attendance of Colin Snelgrove

=== 2019 election ===
The 2019 Uckfield Town Council elections were held alongside the elections for Wealden District Council on 2 May 2019 on new ward boundaries. 9 seats were up for election, as only 2 candidates for 3 seats were nominated in Uckfield North ward and 2 candidates for 3 seats in Uckfield Ridgwood ward, with incumbent Councillor Keith Everett having submitted his nomination papers, but passing away before the close of nominations. At the first meeting of the new Town Council, Karen Bedwell was co-opted as a Councillor for Ridgewood ward and Colin Snelgrove co-opted as a Councillor for North ward, filling all 15 seats on the council. Both Councillors Bedwell and Snelgrove subsequently joined the Trust Independent group. Diane Ward, who ran as an independent councillor, also sits with the Trust Independent group.

Ward	Party	Town councillors elected 2019
North	Independent	Jackie Love
North	Labour	Angie Smith
East	Liberal Democrats	Paul Sparks
East	Independent	Chris Macve
East	Independent	Donna French
New Town	Conservative	Helen Firth
New Town	Labour	Ben Cox
New Town	Independent	Spike Mayhew
New Town	Independent	Duncan Bennett
West	Independent	Diane Ward
West	Conservative	Gary Johnson
Ridgewood	Liberal Democrats	James Edwards
Ridgewood	Independent	Jez Beesley

=== 2015–2019 by-elections ===
By-election	Date	Incumbent party	Result	Candidate	Reason
Ridgewood	31 August 2017	Independent	Independent	Jez Beesley	Resignation of Jacqueline Beckford
North	12 July 2018	Independent	Labour	Daniel Manvell	Resignation of James Anderson

=== Change of party affiliation 2016 ===
On the 5 July 2016 it was announced that Cllr Spike Mayhew & Cllr Jacqueline Beckford had resigned from the Liberal Democrats. It was reported that they would now be acting as Independent Councillors.

Date	Ward	Result		Candidate	Reason
5 July 2016	New Town	Liberal Democrats	Independent	Spike Mayhew	Change of party affiliation
5 July 2016	Ridgewood	Liberal Democrats	Independent	Jacqueline Beckford	Change of party affiliation

=== 2015 election ===
The 2015 Uckfield Town Council elections were held alongside the elections for Wealden District Council & the Wealden Parliamentary constituency on 7 May 2015. All 15 seats were up for election.

Ward	Party	Town councillors elected 2015
North	Independent	James Anderson
North	Independent	Louise Eastwood
North	Independent	Donna French
North	Independent	Jackie Love
North	Independent	Chris Macve
North	Liberal Democrats	Paul Sparks
Central	Conservative	Helen Firth
Central	Liberal Democrats	Paul Meakins
Central	Independent	Diane Ward
New Town	Independent	Duncan Bennett
New Town	Independent	Mick Dean
New Town	Liberal Democrats	Spike Mayhew
Ridgewood	Liberal Democrats	Jacqueline Beckford
Ridgewood	Independent	Keith Everett
Ridgewood	Independent	Ian Smith

=== 2011–2015 by-elections ===
By-election	Date	Incumbent party	Result	Candidate	Reason
North	27 June 2013	Conservative	Independent	Paul Sparks	Resignation of Duncan Bennett
Central	26 June 2014	Conservative	Liberal Democrats	Paul Meakins	Resignation of Brian Marsh

=== 2011 election ===
In the 2011 elections, 7 seats were won by the Conservatives, 5 by the Liberal Democrats and 3 by independents.

Ward	Party	Town councillors elected 2011
North	Conservative	Duncan Bennett
North	Independent	Sam Bryant
North	Liberal Democrats	John Collins
North	Conservative	Louise Eastwood
North	Independent	Thelma Rumbelow
North	Liberal Democrats	Alan Whittaker
Central	Conservative	John Carvey
Central	Conservative	Helen Firth
Central	Conservative	Brian Marsh
New Town	Liberal Democrats	Sarah Hall
New Town	Liberal Democrats	Jeremy Hallett
New Town	Conservative	Jim Molesworth-Edwards
Ridgewood	Liberal Democrats	Michael Harker
Ridgewood	Conservative	Marion Rowland
Ridgewood	Independent	Ian Smith

=== 2007–2011 by-elections ===
By-election	Date	Incumbent party	Result	Candidate	Reason
New Town	16 April 2009	Independent	Liberal Democrats	Jeremy Hallett	Death of Barrie Murray

=== 2007 election ===
In the 2007 elections, 6 seats were won by Independent candidates, 6 by the Liberal Democrats and 3 by the Conservatives.

Ward	Party	Town councillors elected 2007
North	Independent	Leonard Ashby
North	Independent	Duncan Bennett
North	Independent	Louise Eastwood
North	Independent	Thelma Rumbelow
North	Liberal Democrats	Dorothy Sparks
North	Liberal Democrats	Alan Whittaker
Central	Conservative	John Carvey
Central	Conservative	Helen Firth
Central	Conservative	Jim Molesworth-Edwards
New Town	Liberal Democrats	Sarah Hall
New Town	Independent	Barrie Murray
New Town	Liberal Democrats	Anne Parker
Ridgewood	Liberal Democrats	Michael Harker
Ridgewood	Independent	Ian Smith
Ridgewood	Liberal Democrats	Robert Sweetland

=== 2003–2007 by-elections ===
By-election	Date	Incumbent party	Result	Candidate	Reason
Central	16 September 2004	Independent	Liberal Democrats	John McGuckin	Unfilled
Ridgewood	16 September 2004	Independent	Liberal Democrats	Michael Harker	Unfilled
New Town	24 November 2005	None	Liberal Democrats	Sarah Hall	Unknown

=== 2003 election ===
In the 2003 elections, 5 seats were won by the Liberal Democrats, 3 by the Conservatives, 2 by Labour & 2 by Independent candidates. 2 seats were unfilled in Central Ward and 1 seat was unfilled in Ridgewood.

Ward	Party	Town councillors elected 2003
North	Labour	Leonard Ashby
North	Labour	Duncan Bennett
North	Independent	Louise Eastwood
North	Conservative	Thelma Rumbelow
North	Liberal Democrats	Dorothy Sparks
North	Liberal Democrats	Alan Whittaker
Central	Conservative	Richard Vanderpump
New Town	Liberal Democrats	Libby Calton
New Town	Independent	Barrie Murray
New Town	Liberal Democrats	Ian Nottage
Ridgewood	Conservative	James Molesworth-Edwards
Ridgewood	Liberal Democrats	Anthony Parker

== Mayoral history ==
Year	Name	Party	Notes
2021–24	Jackie Love	Independent	
2018–21	Spike Mayhew	Independent	
2015–18	Louise Eastwood	Independent	
2013–15	Ian Smith	Independent	
2010–13	John Carvey	Conservative	
2009–10	Leonard Ashby	Independent	
2006–09	Louise Eastwood	Conservative	
2001–06	Barrie Murray	Independent	
