= Five Ash Down =

Village in East Sussex, England

Coordinates: 51.002209°N 0.107504°E

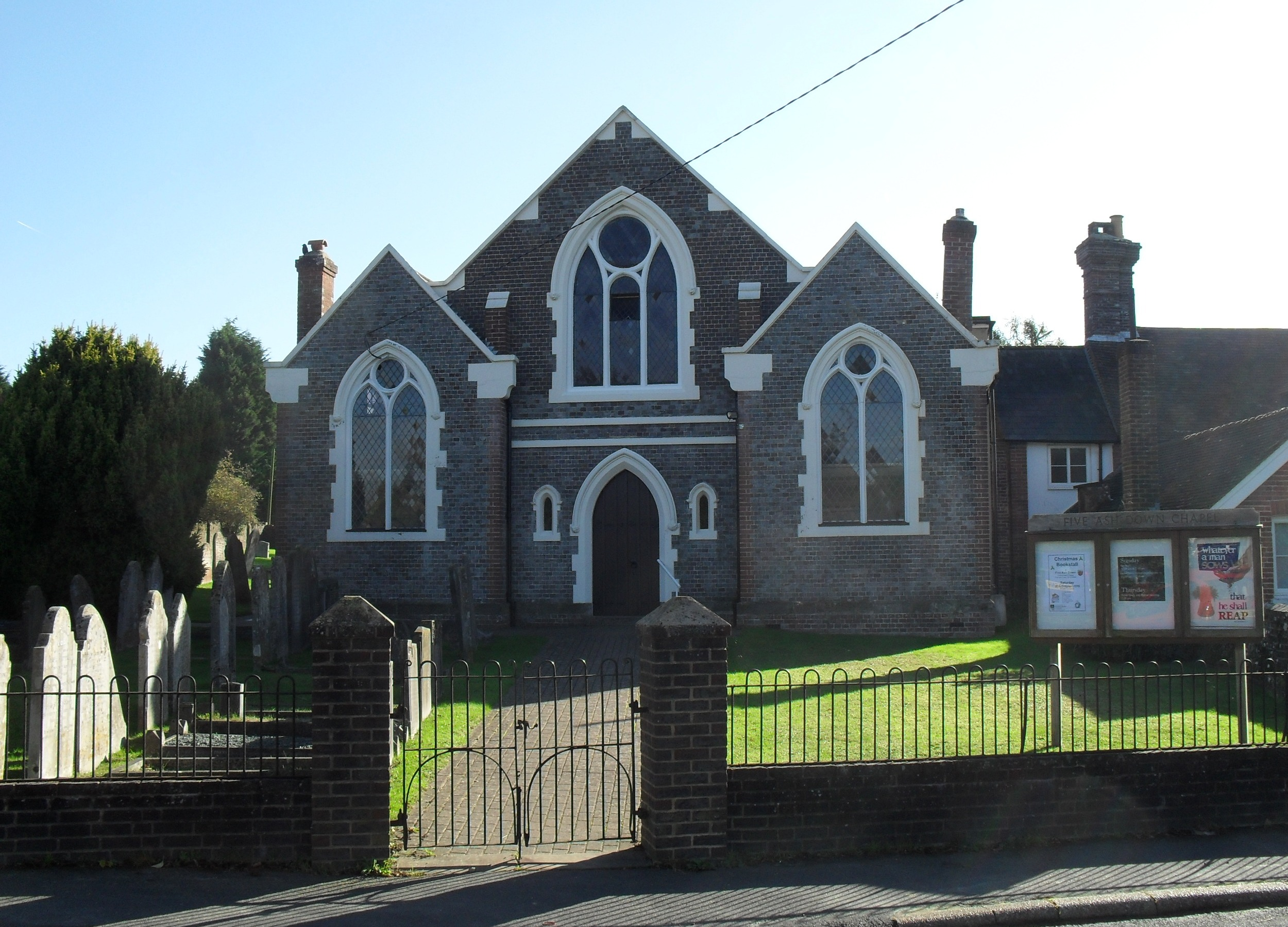
- Five Ash Down Independent Chapel

- Location within East Sussex
- OS grid reference: TQ4797024649
- Civil parish: Buxted
- District: Wealden
- Shire county: East Sussex
- Region: South East
- Country: England
- Sovereign state: United Kingdom
- Post town: UCKFIELD
- Postcode district: TN22 3
- Dialling code: 01825
- Police: Sussex
- Fire: East Sussex
- Ambulance: South East Coast
- UK Parliament: Wealden

Five Ash Down is a small village within the civil parish of Buxted, in the Wealden district of East Sussex, England. Its nearest town is Uckfield, which lies approximately 1.8 miles (2.9 km) south from the village. The village lies on the A26 road between Uckfield and Crowborough. Five Ash Down is home to the Pig and Butcher public house, a village hall which has a weekly timetable of events and the village shop and Post Office. Five Ash Down Independent Chapel, an Evangelical church, was founded in 1773 and moved to its present site in 1784, although in its present form the chapel is mostly Victorian.
