= Ridgewood, East Sussex =

Suburb of Uckfield, England

Coordinates: 50.9590°N 0.1007°E

Ridgewood
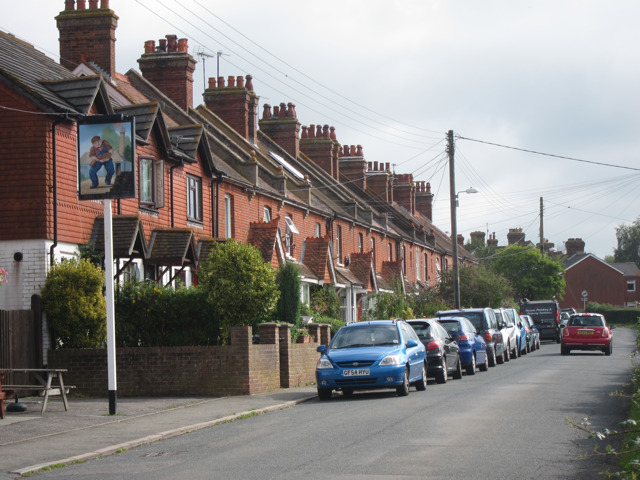
- New Road

- Location within East Sussex
- Population: 3,152 (2021)
- OS grid reference: TQ473209
  - London: 39 miles (63 km) NNW
- District: Wealden
- Shire county: East Sussex
- Region: South East
- Country: England
- Sovereign state: United Kingdom
- Post town: UCKFIELD
- Postcode district: TN22
- Dialling code: 01825
- Police: Sussex
- Fire: East Sussex
- Ambulance: South East Coast
- UK Parliament: East Grinstead and Uckfield

Ridgewood is a suburb and voting ward 1 mile south of Uckfield in East Sussex, England. It is inland between the seaside towns of Eastbourne (20 mi (32 km)) and Brighton (17 mi (27 km)) and approximately 6 miles from Ashdown Forest. In 2021, the ward had a population of 3,152.

== Uckfield Millenium Green ==
In the 1920s, the brickworks of Benjamin Ware & Sons "thrived", with many clay pits established on and around the site. On 9 March 1922, a lease for the land of Shipreed Farm was granted to Benjamin Ware & Sons, with clay pits being dug soon after. This was followed by the installation of clay-working machinery, with a narrow gauge track being laid so clay could be transported to the brickworks. On 21 September 1937, William Ware bought the site for £2000, and until the 1960s, the available clay was exploited, with two deep pits and many shallower ones dug there. The works closed in 1970 as there was no longer any need for their products after the invention of things like plastic flowerpots. The site was eventually acquired by East Sussex County Council, who wanted to establish a recycling site in the disused pits, however since the brickworks' closure, nature had taken over, leading to the two pits being declared a Site of Nature Conservation Interest in 1996. In 1997, local residents, with the help of Uckfield Town Council and East Sussex County Council, a successful application was made to the Countryside Agency for a grant to establish a Millennium Green on the site, and on 30 March 1998, a trust was established. The 22-acre (8.9 ha) site is the largest of all 245 Millennium Green sites in the country.
