= Uckfield College =

Coordinates: 50.9743°N 0.1024°E

Location
- Downsview Crescent; Uckfield, East Sussex, TN22 3DJ; England

Information
- Type: Community school
- Motto: Love Learning for Life
- Established: 15 October 1953; 72 years ago
- Local authority: East Sussex
- Department for Education URN: 114590 Tables
- Ofsted: Reports
- Chair of Governors: Katharine Rabson Stark
- Principal: Sara Marshallsay
- Staff: 198 (2020-2021)
- Gender: Mixed
- Age: 11 to 18, also adult education through ACRES
- Enrolment: Approx. 1,614 (2023-2024)
- Colours: Navy blue and purple
- Website: www.uckfield.college

Uckfield College (formerly Uckfield ,Community Technology College) is a community college situated in Uckfield, UK. It has approximately 1,614 students, including 312 in the sixth form college, according to their most recent Ofsted report. As of September 2023, Sara Marshallsay is the Principal..

== Inspections by Ofsted. ==
The college's most recent full inspection by Ofsted was in 2024, with a judgement of Outstanding in every area.

== School activities ==
The college runs a number of educational and cultural events, including an annual Model United Nations known as "MUNGA" (Model United Nations General Assembly), international group trips, and local student drama and music performances..

== Logo ==
The college's current logo (introduced in 2018 as part of a rebrand) depicts a shield with a Martlet along with the school's name and colours.

== Previous headteachers ==
Past Headteachers are: Harold Pearmain 1953 to 1974, Malcolm Elliman 1974 to 1977, David Rebbitt 1977 to 1999, Craig Pamphilon 1999 to 2008, Hugh Hennebry 2008 to 2023 and Sara Marshallsay from 2023–present.

== Notable former pupils ==
- Rory Graham, better known as Rag'n'Bone Man
- Ed Tullett, also known as Lowswimmer, songwriter/producer
- Suzanne Dando, gymnast
