= Five Ash Down Independent Chapel =

Five Ash Down Chapel
- Five Ash Down Independent Chapel
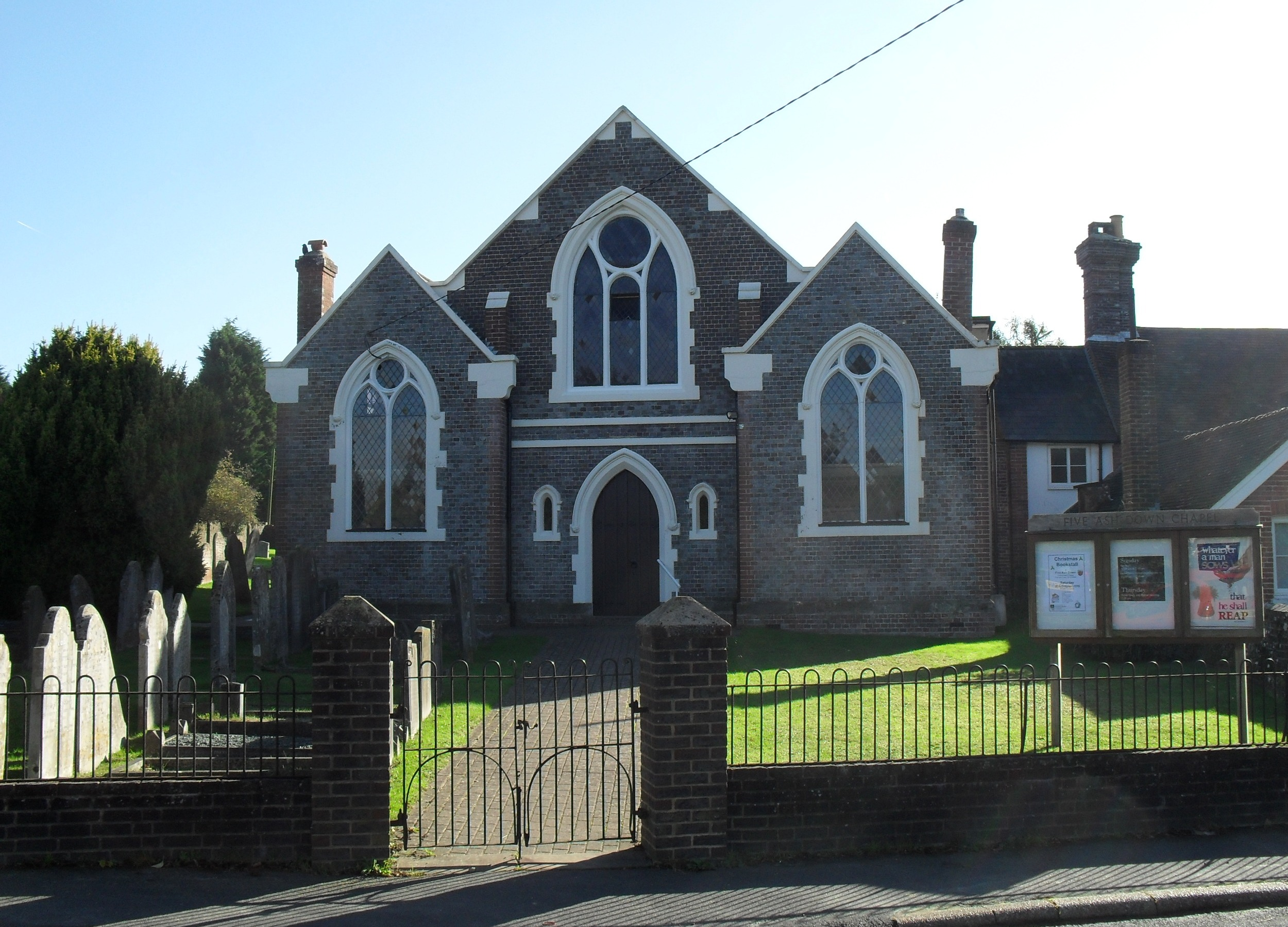
- The chapel in 2010, seen from the west

- Location of the church within East Sussex
- 50.9958°N 0.1816°E
- Location: A26, Five Ash Down, Uckfield, East Sussex TN22 3AL
- Country: England
- Denomination: Evangelical
- Previous denomination: Independent Calvinistic
- Churchmanship: Independent Reformed Evangelical
- Website: fiveashdownchapel.org.uk

History
- Status: Church
- Founded: 1773
- Founder: Thomas Dicker junior
- Events: 1784: opened in present building 1852: extended 1896: refronted

Architecture
- Functional status: Active
- Architectural type: Chapel
- Style: Early English Gothic Revival
- Years built: 1784
- Completed: April 1784

Clergy
- Pastor: George Rabey

Five Ash Down Independent Chapel is an independent Evangelical church in the Reformed (Calvinist) tradition in the hamlet of Five Ash Down, East Sussex, England. Founded in 1773 in the house of a local man, Thomas Dicker Sr. The cause developed so rapidly that a church was founded and a permanent building erected for the congregation 11 years later. The church was run along Calvinistic lines at first, in common with many new chapels in late 18th-century Sussex, and an early group of seceders from the congregation founded a chapel in nearby Uckfield which was run in accordance with Baptist theology. The Five Ash Down chapel has been described as "the parent of many other places [of worship] both Baptist and Independent" across Sussex, and it has continued into the 21st century—now as a small Evangelical fellowship but still worshipping in the original chapel, whose present appearance is a result of expansion and refronting during the Victorian era.

== History ==
Protestant Nonconformism was a prominent force in East Sussex from the 17th century onwards, and congregations associated with various Calvinistic groups and denominations developed in many places from the middle of the 18th century. The Sussex form of Calvinism is "explicitly rooted in 16th-century puritanism" and the missionary activity of several itinerant preachers who travelled around the countryside regularly, often preaching in the open air. Several chapels, including Zoar Strict Baptist Chapel and Golden Cross Chapel which are still open, were founded in the Dicker area—a mostly rural area close to the present towns of Eastbourne and Hailsham (the villages of Upper Dicker and Lower Dicker are in the parishes of Arlington and Hellingly respectively). Dicker is also the surname of a long-established family of landowners in rural East Sussex whose lineage goes back to the 13th century; it is not known whether the family gave their name to the area or vice versa.

Rev. Richard de Courcy, an Anglican clergyman who also undertook outdoor preaching, visited the town of Uckfield in 1772 and delivered "an impressive sermon to a considerable crowd". Among them was Thomas Dicker junior (born 1723), a member of one branch of the Dicker family who had settled in nearby Buxted parish. Until then he had attended the local Anglican church; but after hearing de Courcy's "fiery sermon" he was converted to the Calvinist cause and started holding meetings in accordance with these doctrines at his house in Five Ash Down, a hamlet 3/4 mile (1.2 km) northwest of Buxted village. Over the next 11 years, attendance at these meetings grew so much that the room was no longer large enough, so services were also held at a nearby inn for a time. It was while preaching at this inn that William Huntington, one of the most important figures in Sussex Calvinist history, first met fellow Calvinist missionary Jenkin Jenkins of Lewes, who became a close friend; later they were both associated with the founding of Jireh Chapel in Lewes, one of the largest Calvinist churches in Sussex.

In 1784, Dicker's father Thomas Dicker senior—who had also been converted to the Calvinist cause in 1773—donated some land next to his house to the congregation. They erected a chapel there in the early months of 1784, and it opened in April of that year. In contrast to local Anglican churches, "the more simple mode of worship of the Nonconformists was adopted", but the church formally subscribed to the same articles of faith as the Church of England.

Division amongst the congregation occurred in early 1785 over the doctrine of baptism. The principal theological difference between Calvinistic Independents and the branch of Baptist churches known as Strict and Particular Baptists is that to the latter, "baptism is the door to the church and communion [should be] confined to those who are members". Members of the congregation who preferred the stricter doctrine broke away from Five Ash Down Chapel and formed a new church along Strict Baptist lines at a farm in Uckfield on 15 May 1785. Land was bought for a larger chapel in 1788, and Uckfield Baptist Church opened in February 1789. The first pastor at Five Ash Down Chapel, A. Dixon, left soon after this, and visiting ministers served the chapel for many years—including William Huntington on several occasions.

More land was bought adjacent to the chapel in 1840, which allowed a Sunday school to be built in about 1852. Also in that year the chapel was extended and altered as a memorial to Thomas Dicker senior by his grandson. Further changes took place in 1896 when the chapel was re-roofed and refronted in its present Gothic Revival style. By this time the chapel had a resident pastor again, and a permanent Sunday school was started in 1880. After a period of just over 100 years during which four resident pastors had served the chapel, it was again served by visiting or lay ministers from 1962 onwards when Joseph Turner retired after a 38-year pastorate.

The chapel is registered for worship in accordance with the Places of Worship Registration Act 1855; its number on the register is 34990. Under the name Calvinist Independent Chapel it was licensed for the solemnisation of marriages on 11 September 1895. Now known as Five Ash Down Chapel, it is an Evangelical fellowship, independent of denominational links and based on Reformed ecclesiology. Morning and afternoon services and a Sunday school are held on Sundays, and there is a prayer meeting on Thursday evenings. The church's historical records are stored at the East Sussex Record Office at The Keep, Brighton.

== Architecture ==
In its original form the chapel was a simple brick building. Part of the original north wall, 20 feet (6.1 m) in length, remains. Since its reconstruction and refronting in the Victorian era it has an Early English Gothic Revival appearance. Built of blue brick with red-brick quoins, it has a west-facing symmetrical façade with three bays, each topped with a gable and containing a stone lancet window. The projecting side bays were added in 1852 and the recessed central bay dates from 1896. The original building was oriented differently: what is now the side wall, facing north, was originally at the rear of the chapel. There is a graveyard in front of the chapel. Inside is a gallery which may retain parts of the 18th-century structure.

== See also ==
- List of current places of worship in Wealden
- Media related to Five Ash Down Independent Chapel at Wikimedia Commons

== Bibliography ==
- Alexander, Rosemary (1996). A Short History of Buxted (1st ed.). Tunbridge Wells: Opax Ltd.
- Antram, Nicholas; Pevsner, Nikolaus (2013). Sussex: East with Brighton and Hove. The Buildings of England. London: Yale University Press. ISBN 978-0-300-18473-0.
- Chambers, Ralph F. (1954). The Strict Baptist Chapels of England – Volume II: Sussex. Thornton Heath: Ralph F. Chambers.
- Elleray, D. Robert (2004). Sussex Places of Worship. Worthing: Optimus Books. ISBN 0-9533132-7-1.
- Homan, Roger (1997). "Mission and Fission: the organization of Huntingtonian and Calvinistic Baptist causes in Sussex in the 18th and 19th centuries". Sussex Archaeological Collections. 135. Lewes: Sussex Archaeological Society. doi:10.5284/1085045. ISSN 0143-8204.
- Stell, Christopher (2002). Nonconformist Chapels and Meeting-houses in Eastern England. Swindon: English Heritage. ISBN 1-873592-50-7.
- s.n. (1984). Five Ash Down Independent (Calvinistic) Chapel 1784 to 1984. Five Ash Down: Five Ash Down Chapel.
