= Uckfield =

Town in East Sussex, England

Coordinates: 50.97°N 0.10°E

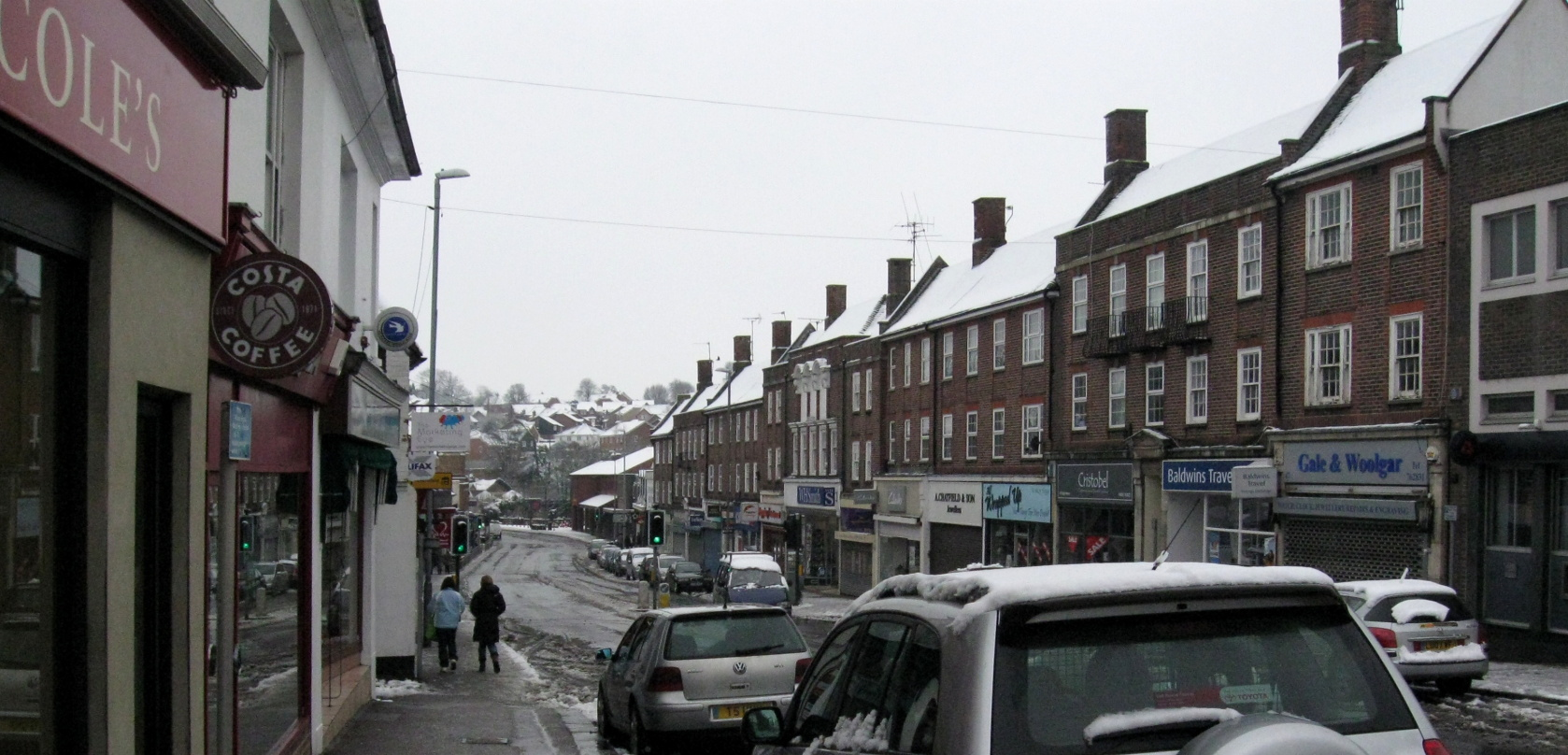
- Uckfield town centre

- Location within East Sussex
- Area: 7.5 km^{2} (2.9 sq mi)
- Population: 14,493 (2011)
  - Density: 4,810/sq mi (1,860/km^{2})
- OS grid reference: TQ473212
  - London: 38 miles (61 km) NNW
- District: Wealden
- Shire county: East Sussex
- Region: South East
- Country: England
- Sovereign state: United Kingdom
- Post town: Uckfield
- Postcode district: TN22
- Dialling code: 01825
- Police: Sussex
- Fire: East Sussex
- Ambulance: South East Coast
- UK Parliament: East Grinstead and Uckfield
- Website: Uckfield Town Council

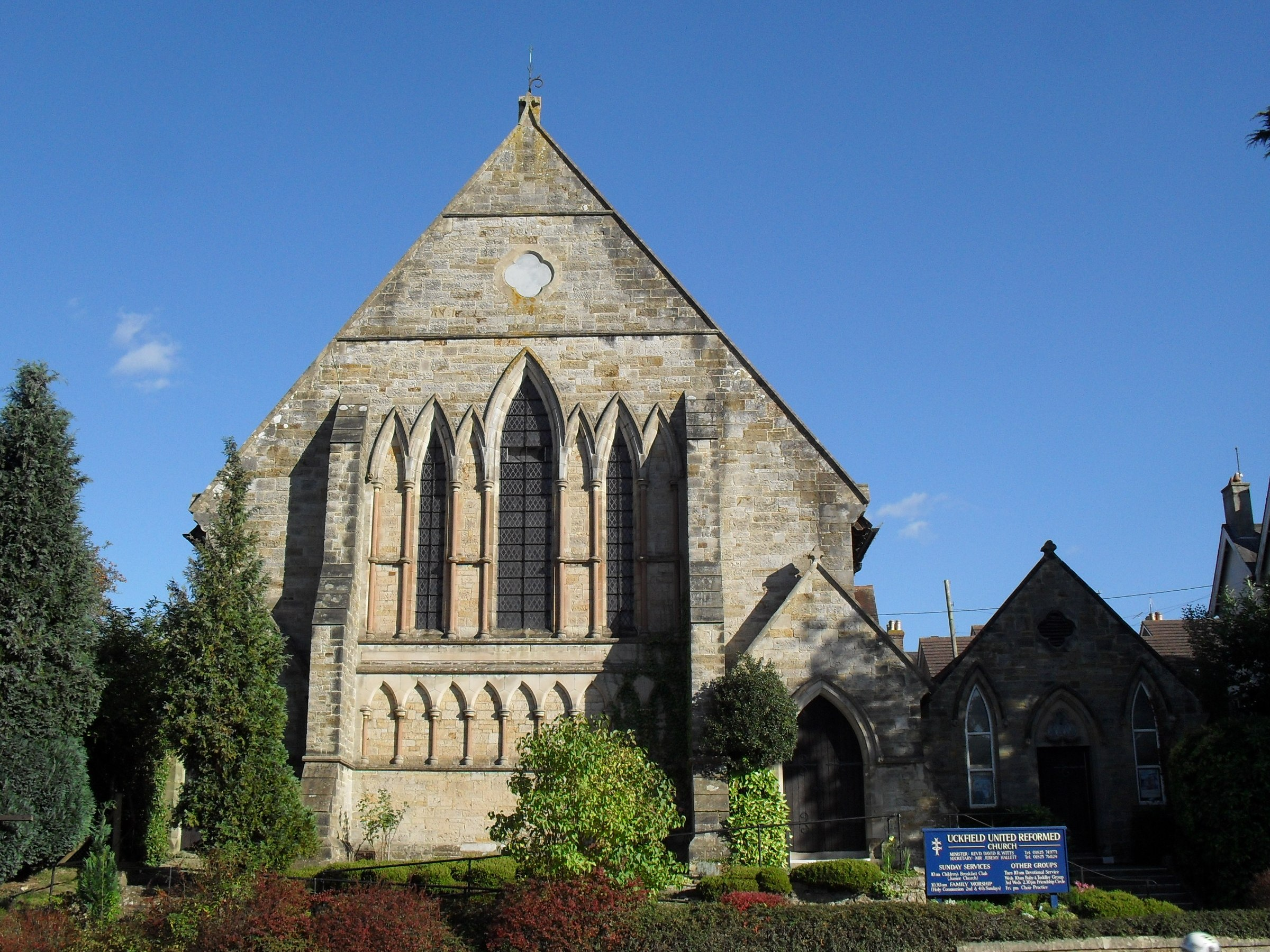
Uckfield United Reformed Church

Uckfield (/ˈʌkfiːld/) is a town in the Wealden District of East Sussex in South East England. The town is on the River Uck, one of the tributaries of the River Ouse, on the southern edge of the Weald.

== Etymology ==
"Uckfield", first recorded in writing as "Uckefeld" in 1220, is an Anglo-Saxon place name meaning "open land of a man called Ucca". It combines an Old English personal name, "Ucca" with the Old English locational term, "feld", the latter denoting open country or unencumbered ground (or, from the 10th century onwards, arable land). A number of other places in the area also contain the suffix "feld", which may be an indication of land that contrasts with the surrounding woodlands of the Weald, including in particular Ashdown Forest immediately to the north.

== History ==
A comprehensive historical timeline can be found at A vision of Britain website.

The first mention in historical documents is in the late 13th century. Uckfield developed as a stopping-off point on the pilgrimage route between Canterbury, Chichester and Lewes. The settlement began to develop around the bridging point of the river, including the locally famous Pudding Cake Lane where travellers visited a public house for slices of pudding cake; and the 15th-century Bridge Cottage, the oldest house still standing in Uckfield, now a museum. The town developed in the High Street and in the New Town areas (the latter to the south of the original town centre).

The Eversfield family, who later became prominent in Sussex history, giving their name to the prime waterfront street of St Leonards-on-Sea, first settled in Uckfield from their Surrey beginnings. The family, who later owned the mansion Denne Park in Horsham, which they represented in Parliament, acquired a large fortune through marriage, real estate acquisition and iron founding. Their climb to wealth and prominence was a heady one: in 15th-century Sussex they were described as "yeomen", but within a generation they were already among the first rank of Sussex gentry.

=== Church Street ===
Church Street was at the heart of the original settlement of Uckfield, near the medieval chapel (built c.1291), which was replaced by the present parish church in 1839. It is situated on an ancient ridgeway route from the direction of Winchester in the west, to Rye and Canterbury in the east. Local hostelries along the route are the Maiden's Head, the King's Head (now the Cinque Ports) or the Spread Eagle. Uckfield was part of the Archbishop's extensive Manor of South Malling.

Church Street contains a number of post-medieval buildings. These include the Old Grammar School (home of the former Uckfield Grammar School, closed in 1930), Bakers Cottage and the Malt House with Malt Cottage (all built before 1700), and Church House with Andertons, Copping Hall and Milton Cottage (all 18th century).

=== Bridge Cottage ===
Studies suggest that the cottage dates to around 1436. Between 1500 and 1900, it was inhabited by a number of local families, including local merchants. In October 2014, the Heritage Lottery Fund granted one million pounds to enable the restoration of the cottage. Work started in October 2014, with an estimated completion date of late summer 2015.

== Governance ==
The town council consists of 15 councillors, representing five wards: West ward (2 councillors); New Town (4); North (3); East (3); and Ridgewood (3). Mayoral elections take place every year.

Uckfield was previously represented at Westminster by Charles Hendry, Member of Parliament for the constituency of Wealden from 2001 until he stood down at the 2015 general election.

On 7 May 2015, Nus Ghani was elected as the MP for Wealden with a majority of 22,967. In the 2017 snap general election, Ghani was re-elected with a slightly increased majority of 23,268.. During the 2019 general election, Ghani was re-elected yet again, with a majority of 25,655.

For the 2024 general election, boundaries were redrawn, with Uckfield falling into the new constituency East Grinstead and Uckfield. Mims Davies was elected as the MP for this new constituency with a majority of 8,480.

== Geography ==
The town of Uckfield has grown up as a road hub, and on the crossing point of the River Uck. Traffic on the A26 between Royal Tunbridge Wells and Lewes, from the north-east to the south-west, joins with that on the A22 London – Eastbourne road around the town on its bypass; whilst the long-distance cross-country A272 road (the old pilgrimage route) crosses them both north of the town.

As the town has grown, new housing estates were developed: Hempstead Fields, Harlands Farm, Rocks Park, West Park, Manor Park and Ringles Cross among them.

Parts of Uckfield, owing to its location on the river, have been subject to extensive flooding on a number of occasions, the earliest recorded being in 1852. More recent floods have occurred approximately every nine years: in 1962, 1974, 1989, 1994, 2000 and 2007, although those in 2007 were not as severe as previous floods. Local residents have long been lobbying for flood defences in the town, and when the local Somerfield became a Co-op (now Waitrose), its car park's walls were rebuilt as flood defences with a ramp to access the car park and a watertight pedestrian gate that can be closed when flooding is imminent. It is hoped that this new wall will act as a reservoir to contain the flood water until it recedes, allowing the water to flow back into the river Uck, which runs alongside the carpark.

Due to the positioning of the river within Uckfield, any flooding is within the lowest part of the town centre and industrial estate, and so does not affect residential areas as these are all built on higher ground. The Hempstead Meadows Nature Reserve can be accessed from the Waitrose car park and shows classic meadows formed on the flood plain.

The West Park Nature Reserve contains a wide variety of habitats; it is located on the western edge of the town.

=== Nature Reserves ===
- West Park

West Park is a Local Nature Reserve. It has several access points, and is a vestige of ancient parkland, containing herb rich uncultivated wet meadow, woodland, some thriving wildlife and the remains of Mesolithic settlement.

- Hempstead Meadows

Hempstead Meadows is a Local Nature Reserve. The River Uck runs through the flood plain, occupied by the Hempstead Nature Reserve, and is an important area of wetland. The area has an abundance of unusual flora and fauna, which flourish on this ideal site. A new footpath, the River walk is a recent introduction to this area.

- Harlands Pond

Harlands Pond, located via Mallard Drive, home of the common toad. Regular visitors include the grey heron, in addition to its permanent residents, the coot and moorhen.

- Nightingale Wood

Almost adjacent to the pond is Nightingale Wood. This is a cool, shady haven, containing many different tree species and is a valuable site for early purple orchids.

- Uckfield Millennium Green

This 22-acre Millennium Green is one of the largest. To the south of the town, in Ridgewood, the Green was created on a site of three disused clay pits (now a SNCI) at the turn of the Millennium.

== Development ==
East Sussex County Council completed phase one of the Uckfield Town Centre Highway Improvement Scheme (UTC-HIS) in November 2014. In January 2016, phase two of the highway improvements were started, taking approximately eight months. The scheme involved the creation of 10,000 m^{2} of retail space within the town. It also limited the number of new homes to be built between then and 2027 to 1000.

In June 2015, the Ridgewood Farm development was granted outline planning approval. The development would see 1000 new homes, of which a minimum of 15 per cent would be affordable housing. The development would include a two-form primary school, a large employment space, community, health and leisure facilities and pedestrian and cycle paths, and a 73-acre Suitable Alternative Natural Green Space (Sangs) nearby.

In July 2015, Network Rail announced plans to upgrade the platforms at Uckfield railway station to accommodate trains with up to 12 carriages. The works were predicted to last from November 2015 until March 2016.

In March 2016, developers were granted a 75 per cent reduction on the roof tax of 146 proposed homes at Mallard Drive, Ridgewood.

== Demography ==
The population of Uckfield in 1811 was 916; in 1841, it was 1,534; in 1861, it was 1,740; in 1871, it was 2,041; in 1881, it was 2,146; in 1891, it was 2,497; in 1901, it was 2,895; in 1911, it was 3,344; in 1921, it was 3,385; and in 1931, it was 3,555. In 2001, the population had reached 13,697. In 2021, the population reached 15,033.

== Transport ==
Uckfield is connected to London Bridge station by Southern services on its Oxted Line via East Croydon. Until 1969, the rail link continued to Lewes; after it was closed, Uckfield became the terminus; the station building was rebuilt in 1991 to allow the removal of a level crossing. The Wealden Line Campaign hopes to reopen the closed section to Lewes.

There are 20 local bus services in the Uckfield area; Brighton and Hove, CTLA, Renown Coaches, The Sussex Bus, Seaford & District and Stagecoach in Eastbourne all serve Uckfield. National Express coaches also operate to London. Uckfield bus station is located off Bell Lane and was rebuilt in 2024.

== Education ==
Uckfield College is the secondary school in the town. There are four primary schools: Harlands Primary School, Rocks Park Primary School St Philips Catholic Primary School and Manor Primary School.

== Churches and chapels ==
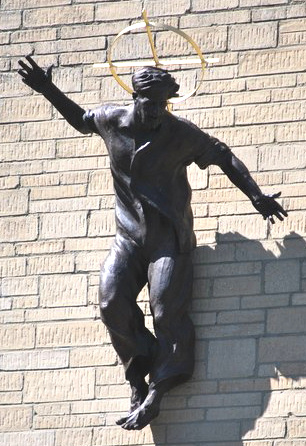
Statue of Jesus Christ by Marcus Cornish, Our Lady Immaculate and St Philip Neri church, dubbed "Jesus in Jeans" by the media

The Church of England parish church is dedicated to the Holy Cross. Queen Elizabeth II made several unannounced low-profile visits to St Michael and All Angels Church, Little Horsted, which became widely known locally when the newsagent was asked to stock a copy of the Sporting Life. The Roman Catholic church is dedicated to Our Lady Immaculate and St Philip Neri. Uckfield Baptist Church was founded in 1785 by seceders from nearby Five Ash Down Independent Chapel, and a new building opened at the top of the High Street in 1789 (rebuilt 1874); it closed in 2005, but the congregation now meet at a school. Other churches and chapels include Methodist, Evangelical (Grange Evangelical Church in Hempstead Road), United Reformed Church and the King's Church.

== Notable people ==
Emma Lee French was born in Uckfield in 1836. Frank Tuohy, prize-winning author and academic, was born in Uckfield in 1925.

Uckfield was the last place Lord Lucan was seen, at Grants Hill House, the home of his friends Ian and Susan Maxwell-Scott. Lady Lucan, his wife, was born in Uckfield. The actress Marjorie Westbury lived at Maresfield near Uckfield.

Nicholas van Hoogstraten, a property developer, owns property in the area. He was engaged in a long-running dispute with the Ramblers' Association about a local footpath running through his land. Work came to a halt on Hamilton Palace in 2001.

The singer Rag'n'Bone Man is from this town. A winner of the Brit Award for Critics' Choice 2017, he had a number one single across Europe with the song "Human".

The actor Roman Griffin Davis is from this town, he starred in the film Jojo Rabbit, for which he was nominated for a Golden Globe Award.

== Folklore ==
There are a number of mysteries and myths associated with the town and surrounding areas. The most well known is the disappearance of Lord Lucan, who was reportedly last seen at Grants Hill House in Uckfield. In addition, the hoax of the Piltdown Man occurred in the nearby village of Piltdown. There is a tale of Nan Tuck's Ghost, in which an old witch is said to have lived in a wood in nearby Buxted. There is an area of the wood where nothing grows, and the ghost is said to chase people who wander along Nan Tuck's Lane at night.

== Culture ==
=== The Picture House Cinema ===
The Picture House, an independently run three-screen cinema, was established in 1916 and is one of the oldest in England.

=== Ashdown Radio (formerly Uckfield FM) ===
Uckfield FM is a community radio station that supported Uckfield for its four-week festival in June and at Christmas each year. In July 2009 the station was granted a licence by Ofcom to become a full-time community radio station, broadcasting live to Uckfield and the surrounding areas from 1 July 2010. The station was founded by Mike Skinner, Paddy Rea, Gary King and Alan French and now has more than 80 members, who are all voluntary. In the summer of 2008, ITV's Trinny and Suzannah was filmed at the Bird in Eye studios when Mayor Louise Eastwood was the star of the show. In 2014, the station was granted a five-year extension to its licence, taking "Uckfield FM's service through until 2020". As of 1 April 2022, the station expanded its FM coverage area to take in the neighbouring town of Crowborough, and has re-launched as Ashdown Radio.

=== Uckfield Festival ===
The festival was originally intended "as a one off Millennium year celebration", from this event it has sought to "advance the public in the arts and in particular, the arts of music, speech, drama and the visual arts". A number of local organisations/events have grown from the festival some of these include The Art Trail, The Film Society & Uckfield FM.

=== Uckfield Carnival ===
Uckfield hold an annual torchlight carnival on the first Saturday in September. The High Street is closed in the evening and local bonfire societies, sports teams, schools and businesses join a procession through the town.

=== Twin towns ===
Uckfield is twinned with:

- Quickborn, Germany
- Arques-la-Bataille, France

== Sport and leisure ==
A.F.C. Uckfield Town are the town's main football club, formed by a merger of A.F.C. Uckfield and Uckfield Town in 2014.

Uckfield RFC is the town's Rugby Football Club, with a men's squad, women's squad and various junior levels from U5s to U16s.

== References in literature ==
- The manic playwright character Roland Maule, in the play Present Laughter (1942) by Noël Coward, is from Uckfield.
- Uckfield was mentioned in the last chapter of John le Carré's The Honourable Schoolboy (1977).
- Uckfield was featured in Julian Fellowes's novel Snobs (2004), which includes fictional characters the Marquess and Marchioness of Uckfield.
- The cover of the Ladybird Books children's book Climate Change (2017), co-authored by Charles, Prince of Wales, depicts heavy flooding in Uckfield.
