= Steven Warner (disambiguation) =

Steven Warner, Stephen Warner, or Steve Warner may refer to:

- Steven Warner, film visual effects supervisor
- Steven Warner, played the title role in The Little Prince (1974 film)
- Stephen Warner (1873–1947), evangelical Church of England priest
- Steve Warner (Stephen J Warner, born 1978), American rower

== See also ==
- Steve Wariner (born 1954), American country music singer and songwriter
- Stephen Werner (born 1984), American ice hockey player
