= Eastbourne =

Town in East Sussex, England

Eastbourne Borough of Eastbourne
- Town and borough
- Eastbourne
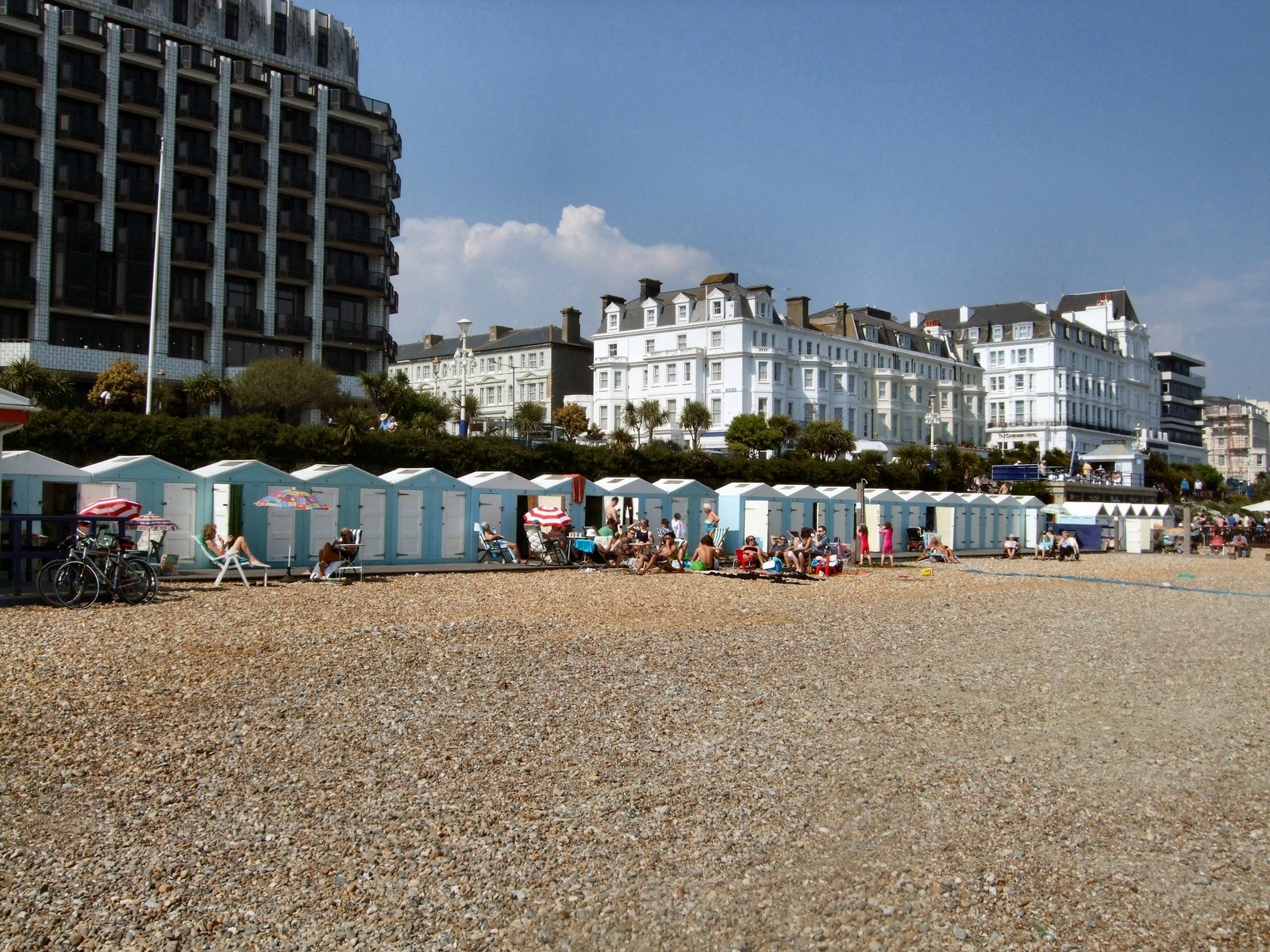
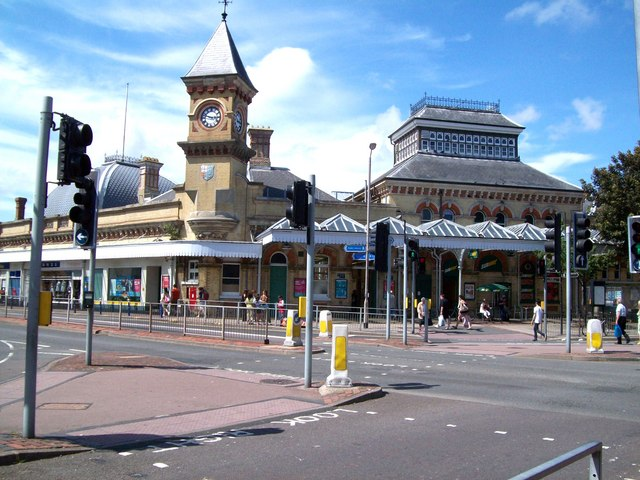
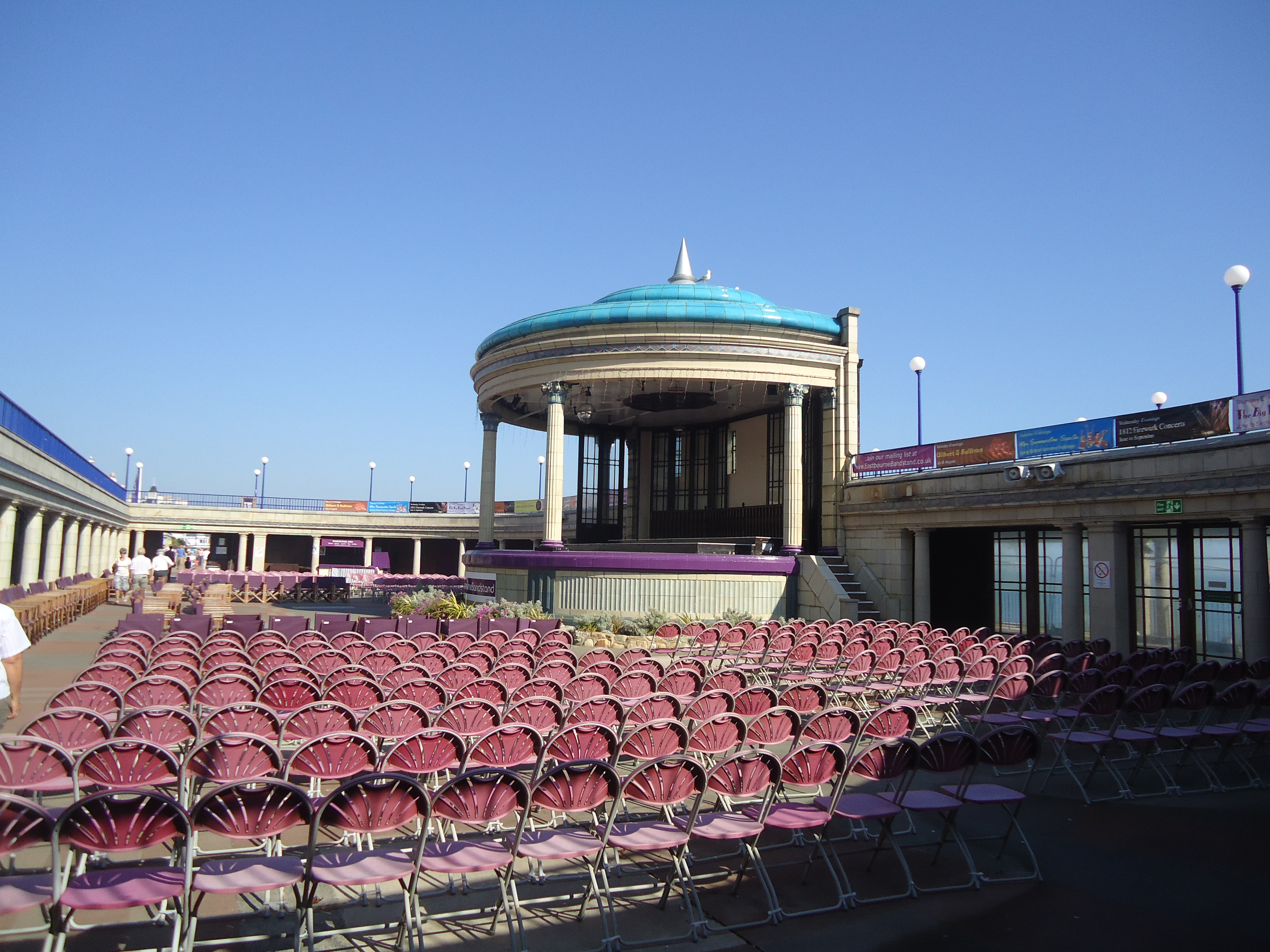
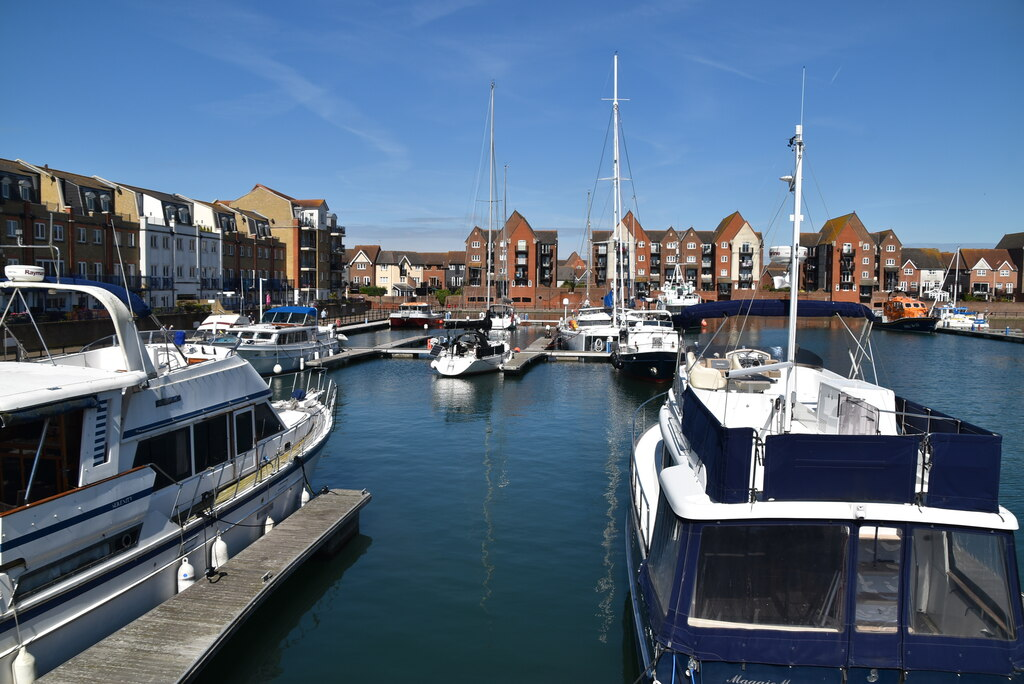
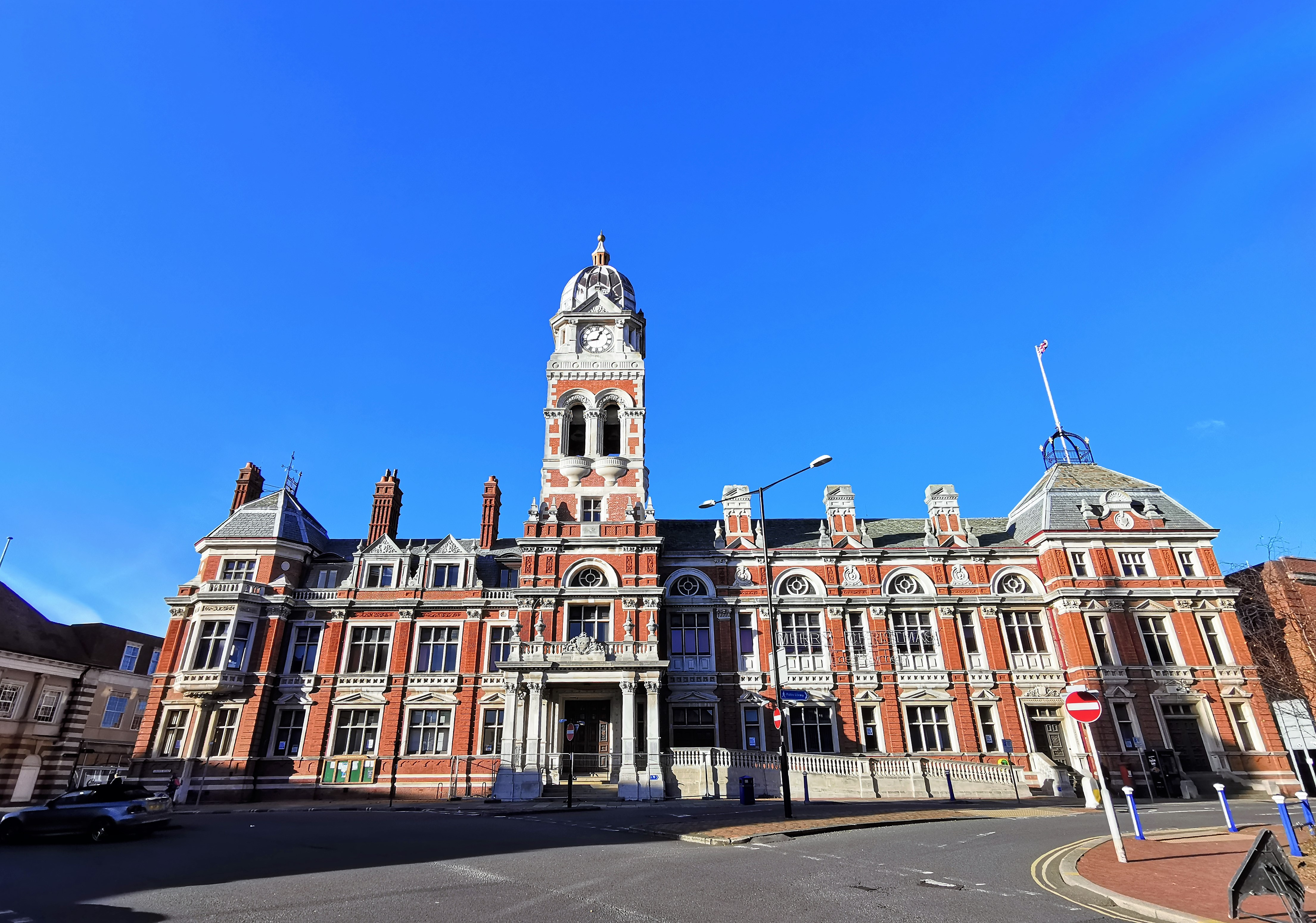
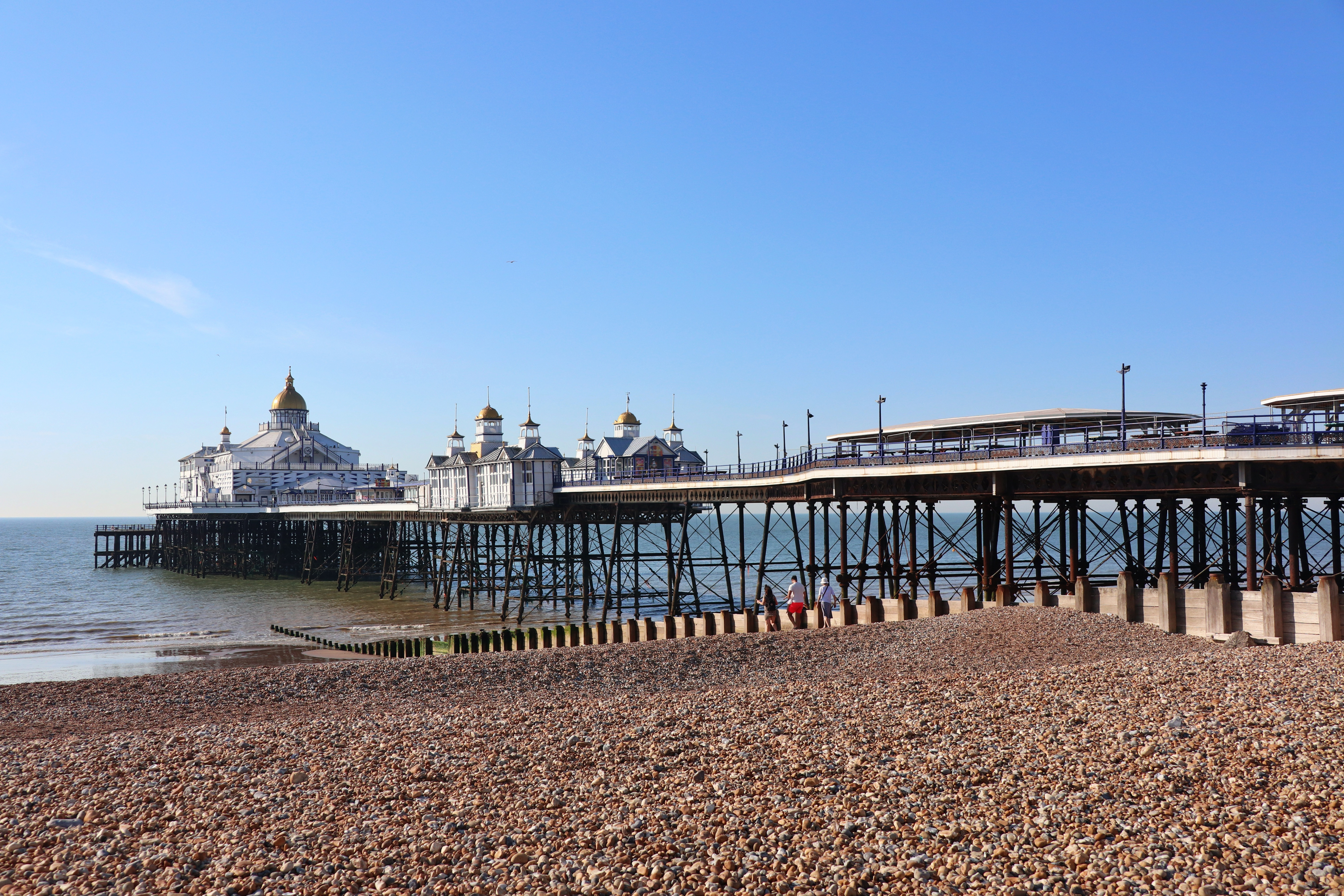
- Clockwise from top left: Beach huts on the front, the main railway station, Sovereign Harbour, pier, town hall and historic bandstand

- Coordinates: 50.77°N 0.28°E
- Sovereign state: United Kingdom
- Constituent country: England
- Region: South East England
- Non-metropolitan county: East Sussex
- Status: Non-metropolitan district

Government
  - MP: Josh Babarinde (MP Liberal Democrats)

Area
  - Total: 17 sq mi (44 km^{2})
  - Rank: 252nd (of 296)

Population (2021 census)
  - Total: 101,689
  - Rank: 239th (of 296)
  - Density: 6,090/sq mi (2,353/km^{2})

Ethnicity (2021)
  - Ethnic groups: List: 90.8% White; 82.1% White British; 3.5% Asian; 2.8% Mixed; 1.7% other; 1.3% Black

Religion (2021)
  - Religion: List: 45.9% Christianity; 43.2% no religion; 6.7% not stated; 2.2% Islam; 0.7% other; 0.6% Buddhism; 0.5% Hinduism; 0.2% Judaism; 0.1% Sikhism
- Time zone: UTC0 (GMT)
  - Summer (DST): UTC+1 (BST)
- Postcodes: BN20-23
- Area code: 01323
- ONS code: 21UC (ONS); E07000061 (GSS)
- OS grid reference: TV608991
- Website: www.lewes-eastbourne.gov.uk

Eastbourne (/ˈiːstbɔːrn/) is a town and seaside resort in the East Sussex county of South East England. It lies 19 miles (31 km) east of Brighton and 54 miles (87 km) south of London; it is immediately east of Beachy Head, the highest chalk sea cliff in Great Britain and part of the larger Eastbourne Downland Estate. It is also a local government district with borough status.

The seafront consists mainly of Victorian hotels, a pier, theatre, contemporary art gallery and a Napoleonic era fort and military museum. Although Eastbourne is a relatively new town, there is evidence of human occupation in the area from the Stone Age. The town grew as a fashionable tourist resort largely thanks to prominent landowner William Cavendish, later to become the Duke of Devonshire. Cavendish appointed architect Henry Currey to design a street plan for the town, but not before sending him to Europe to draw inspiration. The resulting mix of architecture is typically Victorian and remains a key feature of Eastbourne.

As a seaside resort, Eastbourne derives a large and increasing income from tourism, with revenue from traditional seaside attractions augmented by conferences, public events and cultural sightseeing. The other main industries in Eastbourne include trade and retail, healthcare, education, construction, manufacturing, professional scientific and the technical sector.

Eastbourne's population is growing; between 2001 and 2011, it increased from 89,800 to 99,412. The 2011 census shows that the average age of residents has decreased as the town has attracted students, families and those commuting to London and Brighton. In the 2021 census, the population of Eastbourne was 101,689.

== History ==
=== Pre-Roman ===
Flint mines and Stone Age artefacts have been found in the surrounding countryside of the Eastbourne Downs.

A Bronze Age site of national importance was discovered in Hydneye lake at Shinewater in 1995.

Celtic people are believed to have settled on the Eastbourne Downland in 500 BC.

=== Roman era ===
There are Roman remains buried beneath the town, such as a Roman bath and section of pavement between Eastbourne Pier and the Redoubt Fortress. There is also a Roman villa near the entrance to the Pier and the present Queens Hotel.

In 1953, skeletal remains of a woman who lived around 245 AD were discovered in the vicinity of Beachy Head on the Eastbourne Downland Estate. In 2014 the remains were said to be of a 30-year-old woman who grew up in East Sussex, but had genetic heritage from sub-Saharan Africa, giving her black skin and an African skeletal structure. It was claimed that her ancestors came from below the Saharan region, although the Roman Empire had never extended beyond North Africa. These remains have now been DNA tested and found to originate from Cyprus, not sub-Saharan Africa.

=== Anglo-Saxon era ===
An Anglo-Saxon charter, around 963 AD, describes a landing stage and stream at Burne.

The original name came from the 'Burne' or stream which ran through today's Old Town area of Eastbourne. All that can be seen of the Burne, or Bourne, is the small pond in Motcombe Gardens. The bubbling source is guarded by a statue of Neptune. Motcombe Gardens are overlooked by St. Mary's Church, a Norman church which allegedly lies on the site of a Saxon 'moot', or meeting place. This gives Motcombe its name.

In 2014, local metal-detectorist Darrin Simpson found a coin minted during the reign of Æthelberht II of East Anglia (died 794), in a field near the town. It is believed that the minting of these coins may have led to Æthelberht's beheading by Offa of Mercia, as it had been struck as a sign of independence. Describing the coin, expert Christopher Webb, said, "This new discovery is an important and unexpected addition to the numismatic history of eighth century England."

=== Norman era ===
Following the Norman conquest, the Hundred of what is now Eastbourne, was held by Robert, Count of Mortain, William the Conqueror's half brother. The Domesday Book lists 28 ploughlands, a church, a watermill, fisheries and salt pans.

The book referred to the area as 'Borne'; 'East' was added to 'Borne' in the 13th century, renaming the town.

=== Medieval era ===
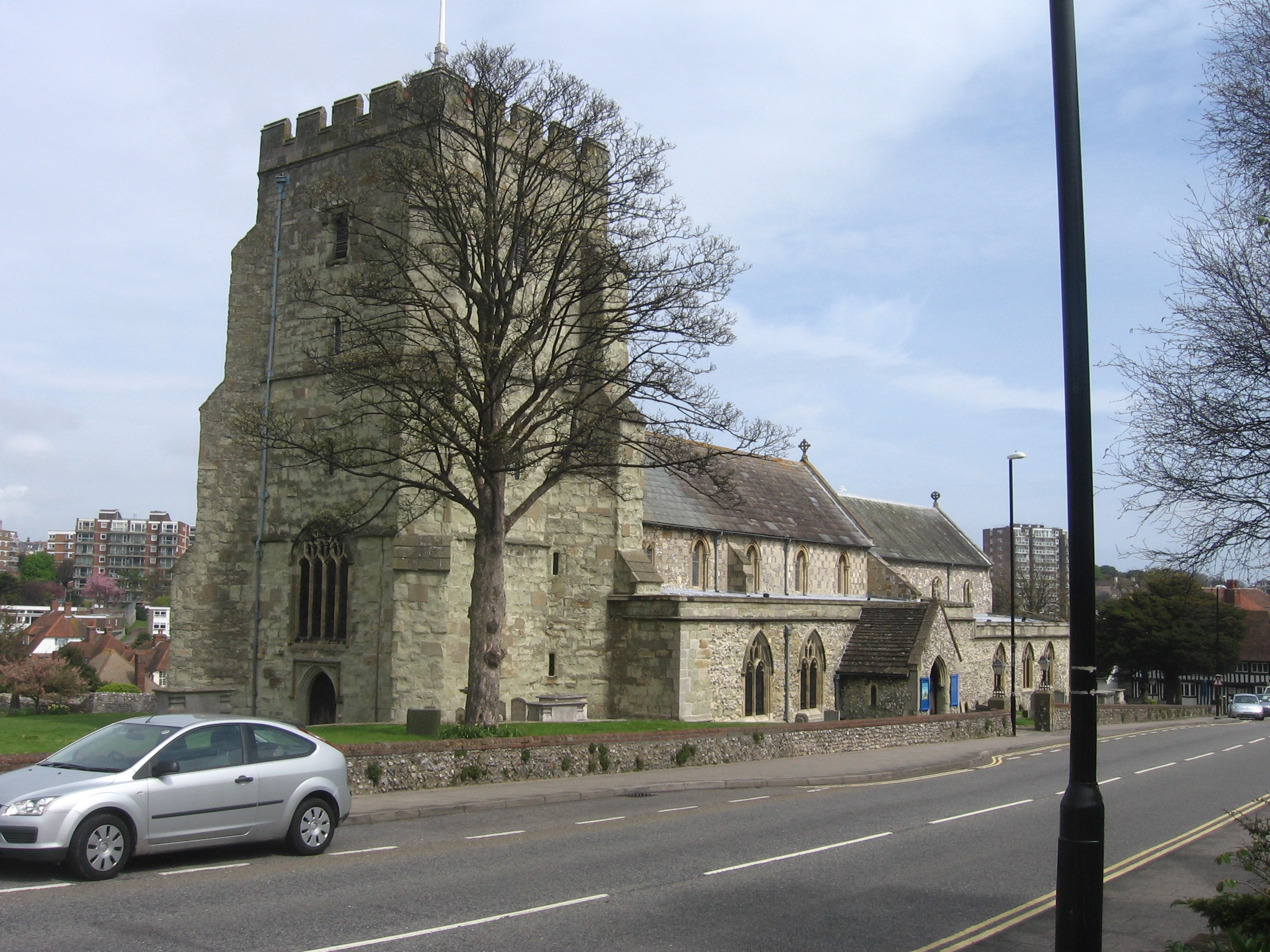
St Mary's Church, Old Town

A charter for a weekly market was granted to Bartholomew de Badlesmere in 1315–16; this increased his status as Lord of the Manor and benefited local industry. During the Middle Ages the town was visited by King Henry I and in 1324 by Edward II. Evidence of Eastbourne's medieval past can be seen in the 12th-century Church of St Mary, and the manor house called Bourne Place.

In the mid-16th century, Bourne Place was home to the Burton family, who acquired much of the land on which the present town stands. This manor house is currently owned by the Duke of Devonshire and was extensively remodelled in the early Georgian era when it was renamed Compton Place. It is one of the two Grade I listed buildings in the town.

Eastbourne has Cornish connections, most notably visible in the Cornish high cross in the churchyard of St Mary's Church which was brought from an unspecified location in Cornwall.

=== Georgian era ===
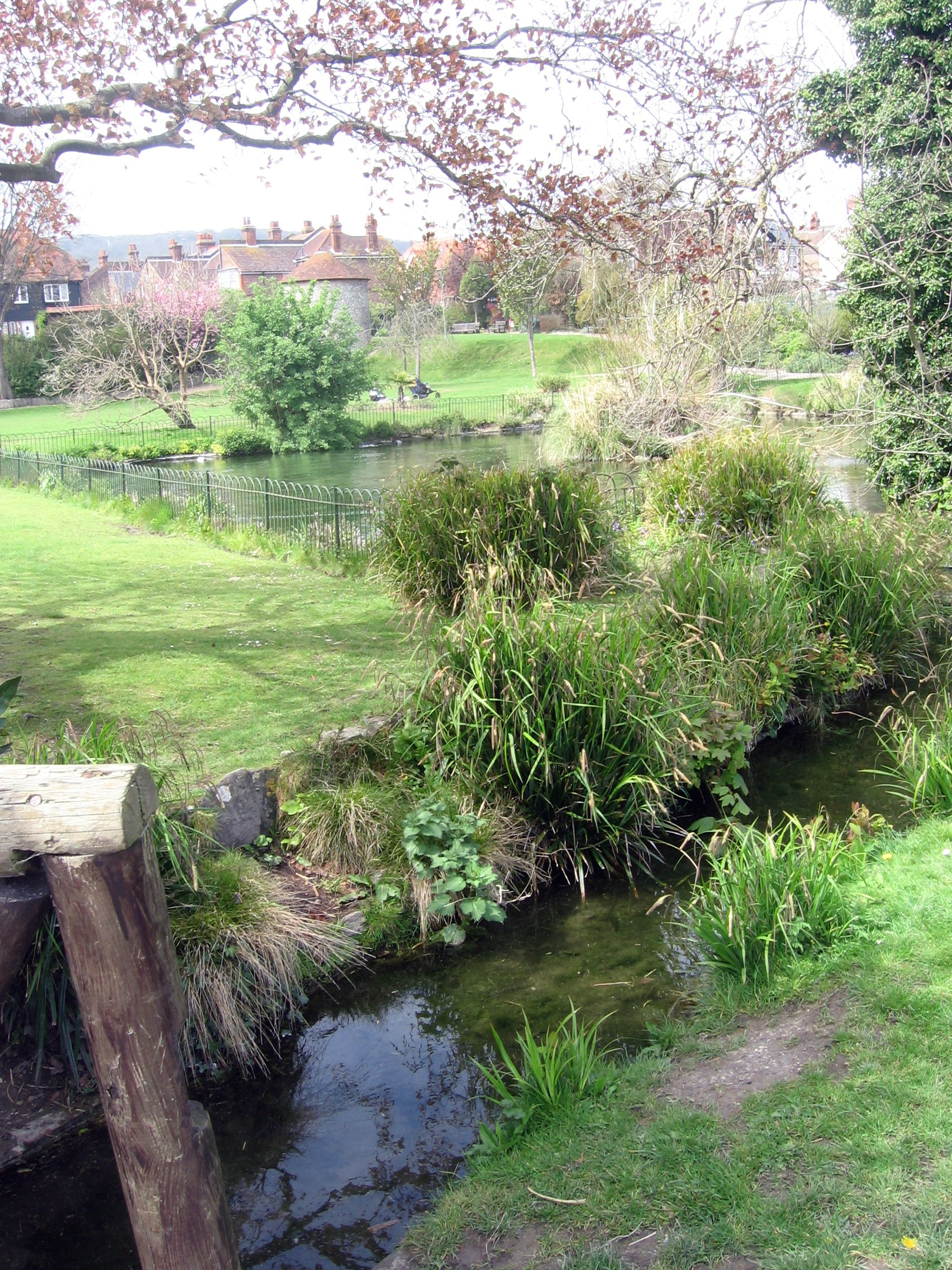
Bourne Stream running through Motcombe Gardens

In 1752, a dissertation by Richard Russell extolled the medicinal benefits of the seaside. His views were of considerable benefit to the south coast and, in due course, Eastbourne became known as "the Empress of Watering Places".

Eastbourne's earliest claim as a seaside resort came about following a summer holiday visit by four of King George III's children in 1780 (Princes Edward and Octavius and Princesses Elizabeth and Sophia).

In 1793, following a survey of coastal defences in the south-east, approval was given for the positioning of infantry and artillery to defend the bay between Beachy Head and Hastings from attack by the French. Fourteen Martello Towers were constructed along the western shore of Pevensey Bay, continuing as far as Tower 73, the Wish Tower at Eastbourne. Several of these towers survive: the Wish Tower is an important feature of the town's seafront and was the subject of a painting by James Sant; part of Tower 68 forms the basement of a house on St. Antony's Hill. Between 1805 and 1807, a fortress known as the Eastbourne Redoubt was built as a barracks and storage depot; it was armed with 10 cannons.

A connection with India comes in the shape of the 18th-century Lushington monument, also at St Mary's, which commemorates a survivor of the Black Hole of Calcutta atrocity which led to the British conquest of Bengal.

Richard Trevithick, the inventor of the steam locomotive, is reported to have spent some time here.

Eastbourne remained an area of small rural settlements until the 19th century. Four villages or hamlets occupied the site of the modern town: Bourne (or, to distinguish it from others of the same name, East Bourne) is now known as Old Town, and this surrounded the bourne (stream) which rises in the present Motcombe Park; Meads, where the Downs meet the coast; South Bourne (near the town hall); and the fishing settlement known simply as Sea Houses, which was situated to the east of the present pier.

=== Victorian era ===
By the mid-19th century, most of the area had fallen into the hands of two landowners: John Davies Gilbert (Note: The Davies-Gilbert family still own much of the land in Eastbourne and East Dean.) and William Cavendish, Earl of Burlington.

The Gilbert family's holdings date to the late 17th and early 18th centuries when barrister Nicholas Gilbert married an Eversfield and Gildredge heiress. (Note: "Gildredge, an ancient house and estate", says Sussex historian Mark Antony Lower, "gave name to a family of considerable antiquity, who subsequently had their chief residence at Eastbourne, and gave their name to the manor of Eastbourne-Gildredge.") The Gildredges owned much of Eastbourne by 1554. The Gilberts eventually made the Gildredge Manor House their own. Today, the Gildredge name lives on in the eponymous park.

An early plan for a town named Burlington was abandoned but, on 14 May 1849, the London, Brighton and South Coast Railway arrived to scenes of great jubilation. With the arrival of the railway, the town's growth accelerated.

Cavendish, now the 7th Duke of Devonshire, recruited Henry Currey in 1859 to lay out a plan for what was essentially an entire new town – a resort built "for gentlemen by gentlemen". The town grew rapidly from a population of less than 4,000 in 1851 to nearly 35,000 by 1891. In 1883, it was incorporated as a municipal borough; a purpose-built town hall was opened in 1886. This period of growth and elegant development continued for several decades.

=== 20th century ===
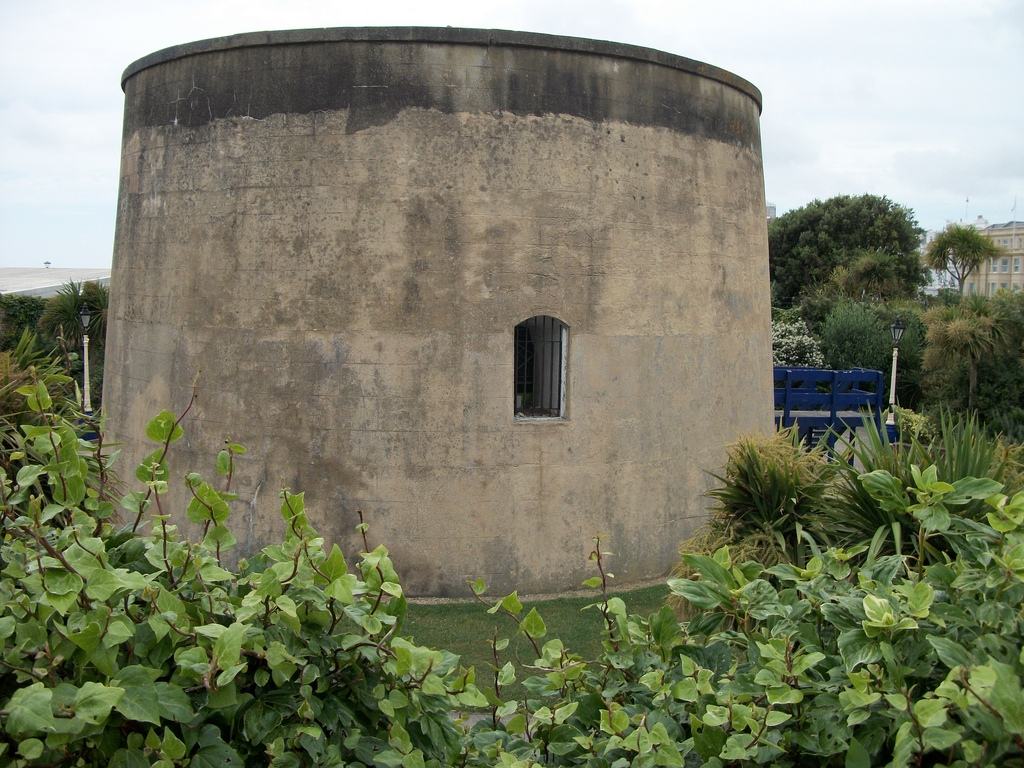
Wish Tower Martello Tower

During the First World War, Summerdown Camp, a convalescent facility, opened in 1915 near the South Downs to treat soldiers who were injured during trench warfare or seriously ill. It was the largest of this type in the UK during this war, treating 150,000; 80% were able to return to fight. The facility was dismantled in 1920. An exhibition about the history of the camp was held in Eastbourne for several months in 2015.

In 1926, the Eastbourne Corporation Act enabled the creation of the Eastbourne Downland Estate.

A royal visit by George V and Queen Mary in March 1935 is commemorated by a plaque on chalet number 2 at Holywell.

The Second World War saw a change in fortunes. Initially, children were evacuated to Eastbourne on the assumption that they would be safe from German bombs, but soon they had to be evacuated again because after the fall of France in June 1940 it was anticipated that the town would lie in an invasion zone. Part of Operation Sea Lion, the German invasion plan, envisaged landings at Eastbourne. Many people sought safety away from the coast and shut up their houses. Restrictions on visitors forced the closure of most hotels and private boarding schools moved away. Many of these empty buildings were later taken over by the services.

The Royal Navy set up an underwater weapons school, and the Royal Air Force operated radar stations at Beachy Head and on the marshes near Pevensey. Thousands of Canadian soldiers were billeted in and around Eastbourne from July 1941 to the run-up to D-Day. Units of the No. 3 (Jewish) Troop of the No. 10 Commando, composed of native German-speaking Austrian and German Jewish refugees, trained in Eastbourne.

The town suffered badly during the war, with many Victorian and Edwardian buildings damaged or destroyed by air raids. Indeed, by the end of the conflict it was designated by the Home Office to have been "the most raided town in the South East region." The situation was especially bad between May 1942 and June 1943 with hit–and–run raids from fighter–bombers based in northern France. Ultimately, 187 civilian people died in the borough through enemy action.

In the summer of 1956, the town came to national and worldwide attention when John Bodkin Adams, a general practitioner serving the town's wealthier patients, was arrested for the murder of an elderly widow. Rumours had been circulating since 1935 regarding the frequency of his being named in patients' wills (132 times between 1946 and 1956) and the gifts he was given (including two Rolls-Royces). Figures of up to 400 murders were reported in British and foreign newspapers, but, after a controversial trial at the Old Bailey, which gripped the nation for 17 days in March 1957, Adams was found not guilty. He was struck off (Note: Officially removed from the list of doctors authorised to practise medicine (treat patients) by the General Medical Council.) for four years, but resumed his practice in Eastbourne in 1961. According to Scotland Yard's archives, he is thought to have killed up to 163 patients in the Eastbourne area.

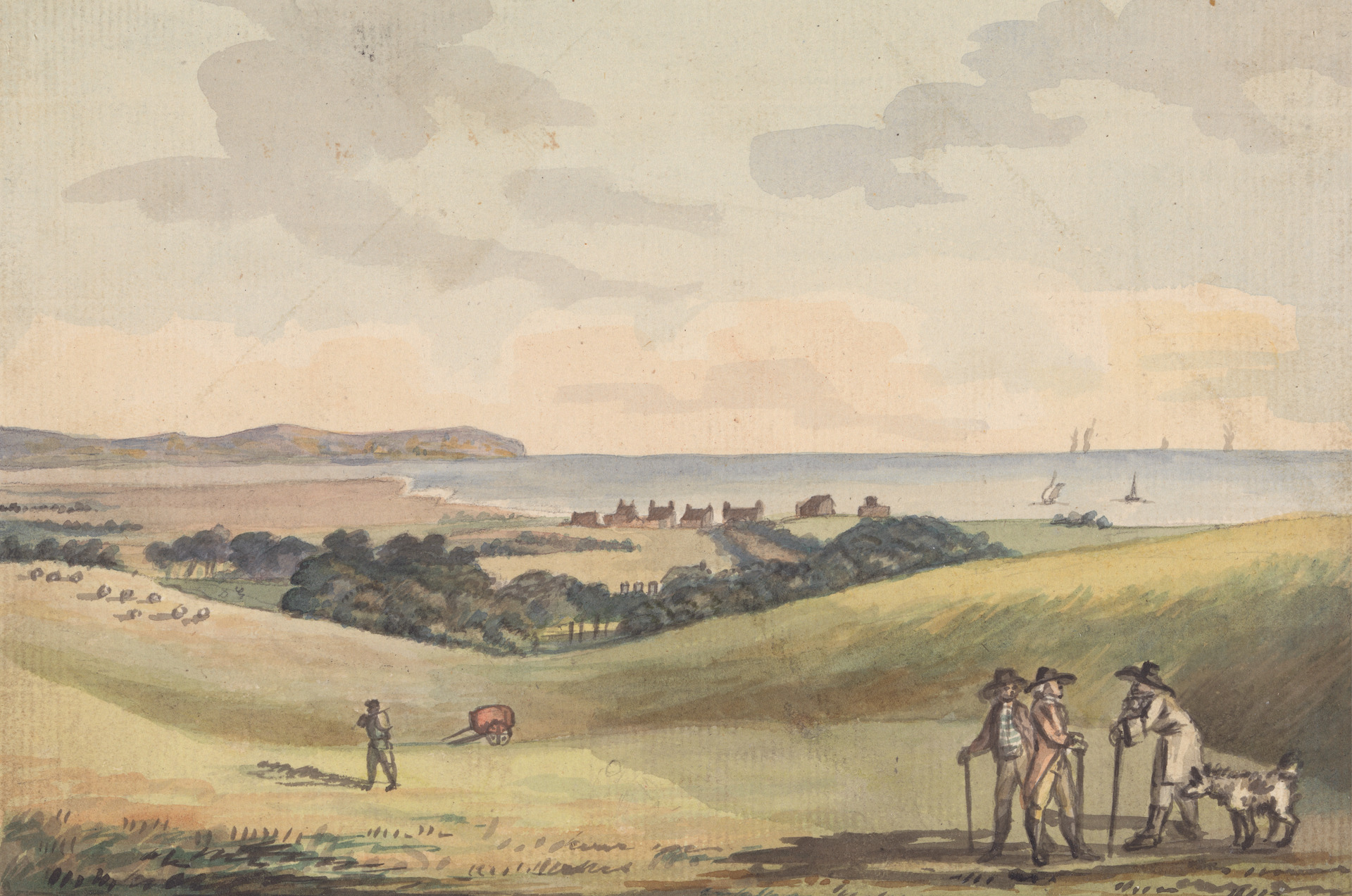
Eastbourne from Lord G. Cavendish's Seat in the Park, John Nixon, 1787

After the war, development continued, including the growth of Old Town up the hillside (Green Street Farm Estate) and the housing estates of Hampden Park, Willingdon Trees and Langney. During the latter half of the 20th century, there were controversies over the demolition of Pococks, a 15th-century manor house on what is now the Rodmill Housing Estate, and the granting of planning permission for a 19-storey block at the western end of the seafront. The latter project (South Cliff Tower) was realised in 1965 despite a storm of protest led by the newly formed Eastbourne and District Preservation Committee, which later became Eastbourne Civic Society, and was renamed the Eastbourne Society in 1999.

Local conservationists also failed to prevent the construction of the glass-plated TGWU conference and holiday centre, (Note: The building is now operating as the View Hotel.) but were successful in purchasing Polegate Windmill, thus saving it from demolition and redevelopment. Most of the expansion took place on the northern and eastern margins of the town, gradually swallowing surrounding villages. However, the richer western part was constrained by the Downs and has remained largely unchanged. In 1981, a large section of the town centre was replaced by the indoor shops of the Arndale Centre.

In the 1990s, both growth and controversy accelerated rapidly as a new plan was launched to develop the area known as the Crumbles, a shingle bank on the coast to the east of the town centre. This area, now known as Sovereign Harbour, containing a marina, shops and several thousand houses, along with luxury flats, was formerly home to many rare plants. There has been continued growth in other parts of the town, and the central marshland has become farmland and nature reserves.

=== 21st century ===
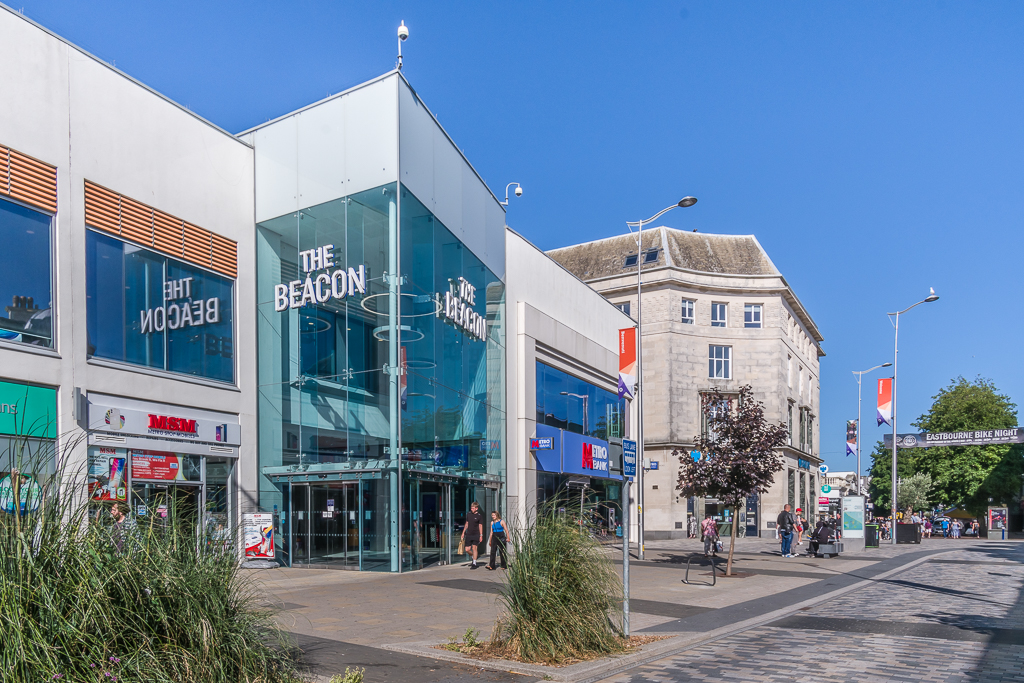
One of the entrances to The Beacon shopping centre, 2024

In 2009, the new Towner Gallery was opened, abutting the listed Congress Theatre, built in 1963.

From 2016 to 2019, extensive remodelling work was undertaken to the prominent Arndale Centre, which takes up most of the town centre, and was originally built by Legal & General Assurance in the 1980s. The town's retail area, including a pedestrianised road and The Beacon, the main shopping centre, which has a catchment of 300,000 people, had an £85 million retail extension creating 570 jobs, it was renamed from the Arndale Centre to The Beacon in November 2018. The expanded centre includes a new cinema, run by Cineworld.

On 22 November 2019, a fire broke out in the basement of the Claremont Hotel. The nearby Pier Hotel was also evacuated.

=== Local history society ===
Eastbourne Local History Society was founded in 1970. It is a charitable, not-for-profit organisation in whose objective is the pursuit and encouragement of an active interest in the study of the history of Eastbourne and its immediate environs and the dissemination of the outcome of such studies.

As the major landowner, the Cavendish family has had strong connections with Eastbourne since the 18th century. The current president of the society is William Cavendish, Earl of Burlington.

Containing over 1,500 articles about the history of Eastbourne, the Society's indexed journal, The Eastbourne Local Historian, is the major historical resource for the town and has been published quarterly since its inception in 1970. Over the years, the Society has published various books and booklets about the history of Eastbourne, twelve of which are currently in print.

== Geography ==
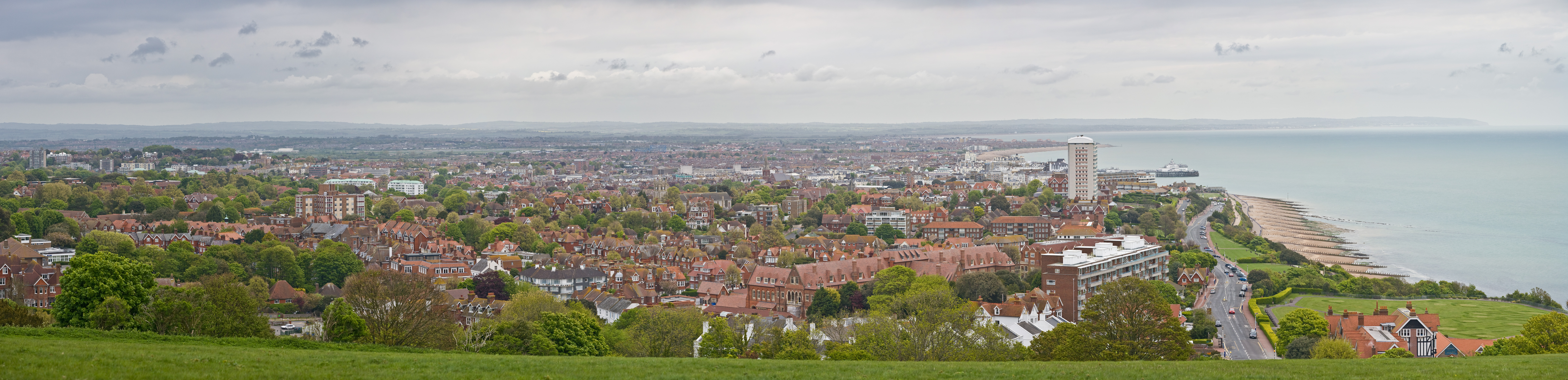
Panoramic view of Eastbourne, as seen from the west on Beachy Head

The South Downs dominate Eastbourne and the Eastbourne Downland Estate can be seen from most of the town. These were originally chalk deposits laid down under the sea during the Late Cretaceous, and were later lifted by the same tectonic plate movements that formed the European Alps, during the middle Tertiary period. The chalk can be clearly seen along the eroded coastline to the west of the town, in the area known as Beachy Head and the Seven Sisters, where continuous erosion keeps the cliff edge vertical and white. The chalk contains many fossils such as ammonites and nautilus. The town area is built on geologically recent alluvial drift, the result of the silting up of a bay. This changes to Weald clay around the Langney estate.

A part of the South Downs, Willingdon Down is a designated Site of Special Scientific Interest. This is of archaeological interest due to a Neolithic camp and burial grounds. The area is also a nationally uncommon tract of chalk grassland rich in species. Another SSSI which partially falls within the Eastbourne district is Seaford to Beachy Head. This site, of biological and geological interest, covers the coastline between Eastbourne and Seaford, plus the Seven Sisters country park and the Cuckmere valley. Several nature trails lead across the Downs to areas such as the nearby villages of East Dean and Birling Gap, and landmarks like the Seven Sisters, Belle Tout Lighthouse and Beachy Head.

=== Suburbs ===
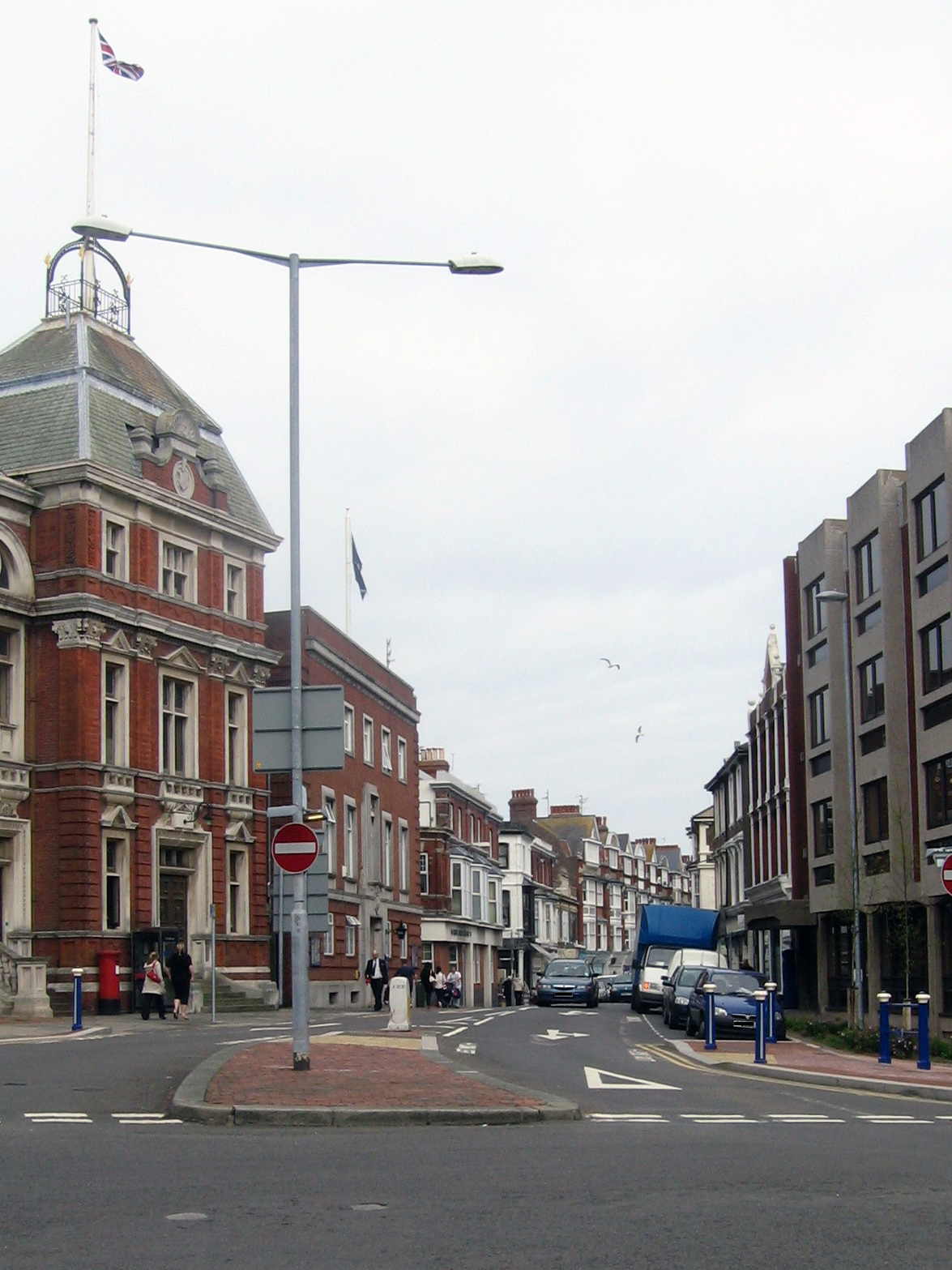
Grove Road, part of the Little Chelsea area

Eastbourne's greater area comprises the town of Polegate, and the civil parishes and villages of Willingdon and Jevington, Stone Cross, Pevensey, Westham and Pevensey Bay village. All are part of the Wealden District. Within Eastbourne's limits are:

- Langney: Langney Rise, Shinewater, Kingsmere, Langney Village
- Hampden Park: Hampden Park Village, Willingdon Trees, Winkney Farm, Ratton
- Inner areas: Rodmill, Ocklynge, Seaside, Bridgemere, Roselands, Downside
- Town centre: Town centre, Little Chelsea, Meads, Holywell, Old Town, Upperton
- Sovereign Harbour: North Harbour, South Harbour, Langney Point.

There was a community known as Norway, Eastbourne in the triangle now bounded by Wartling Road, Seaside and Lottbridge Drove. The name being a corruption of North Way, as this was the route to the north. The area is now a housing estate and the only evidence remaining are a Norway Road and the local church whose sign reads "St Andrew's Church, Norway".

The former fishing hamlet of Holywell (Note: The local pronunciation is 'holly well'.) was situated by the cliff on a ledge some 400 yards to the south-west of the public garden known as the Holywell Retreat. It was approached from what is now Holywell Road, via the lane between the present Helen Gardens and Bede's School, which leads to the chalk pinnacle formerly known locally as 'Gibraltar' or the 'Sugar Loaf'.

The ground around the pinnacle was the site of lime kilns also worked by the fishermen. The fishing hamlet at Holywell was taken over by the local water board in 1896 to exploit the springs in the cliffs. The water board's successors still own the site, and there is a pumping station but little evidence of the hamlet itself, as by now even most of the foundations of the cottages have gone over the cliff.

=== Climate ===
As with the rest of the British Isles and South Coast, Eastbourne experiences a maritime climate with warm summers and mild winters. The local climate is notable for its high sunshine levels, at least relative to much of the rest of England – Eastbourne holds the UK record for the highest recorded amount of sunshine in a month, 383.9 hours in July 1911. Temperature extremes recorded at Eastbourne since 1887 range from 32.6 °C (90.7 °F) on 4 August 1990, down to −11.1 °C (12.0 °F) on 20 January 1940 and 10 February 1916.

Eastbourne's coastal location also means it tends to be milder than most areas, particularly during night. A whole five months of the year have never fallen below 0°C (32°F) and, in July, the temperature has never fallen below 6.1 °C (43.0 °F). All temperature figures relate to the period 1887 onwards. The Köppen Climate Classification subtype for this climate is "Cfb" (Marine West Coast Climate/Oceanic climate).

Climate data for Eastbourne 7 m asl, 1991–2020, Extremes 1887-2023
Month	Jan	Feb	Mar	Apr	May	Jun	Jul	Aug	Sep	Oct	Nov	Dec	Year
Record high °C (°F)	14.8 (58.6)	14.7 (58.5)	19.2 (66.6)	25.5 (77.9)	26.3 (79.3)	30.0 (86.0)	31.9 (89.4)	32.6 (90.7)	27.8 (82.0)	22.6 (72.7)	17.4 (63.3)	15.2 (59.4)	32.6 (90.7)
Mean daily maximum °C (°F)	8.5 (47.3)	8.6 (47.5)	10.6 (51.1)	13.3 (55.9)	16.3 (61.3)	18.9 (66.0)	21.0 (69.8)	21.3 (70.3)	19.2 (66.6)	15.7 (60.3)	11.9 (53.4)	9.3 (48.7)	14.6 (58.3)
Daily mean °C (°F)	6.2 (43.2)	6.1 (43.0)	7.7 (45.9)	10.0 (50.0)	13.0 (55.4)	15.7 (60.3)	17.9 (64.2)	18.1 (64.6)	15.9 (60.6)	12.8 (55.0)	9.4 (48.9)	6.9 (44.4)	11.7 (53.1)
Mean daily minimum °C (°F)	3.9 (39.0)	3.6 (38.5)	4.9 (40.8)	6.7 (44.1)	9.7 (49.5)	12.5 (54.5)	14.7 (58.5)	14.9 (58.8)	12.6 (54.7)	9.9 (49.8)	6.9 (44.4)	4.5 (40.1)	8.8 (47.8)
Record low °C (°F)	−11.1 (12.0)	−11.1 (12.0)	−7.6 (18.3)	−2.8 (27.0)	0.0 (32.0)	3.3 (37.9)	6.1 (43.0)	5.2 (41.4)	2.8 (37.0)	−2.2 (28.0)	−8.3 (17.1)	−8.5 (16.7)	−11.1 (12.0)
Average precipitation mm (inches)	83.1 (3.27)	58.9 (2.32)	47.6 (1.87)	44.4 (1.75)	46.1 (1.81)	46.8 (1.84)	54.1 (2.13)	59.8 (2.35)	59.9 (2.36)	93.2 (3.67)	98.5 (3.88)	100.1 (3.94)	792.6 (31.20)
Average precipitation days (≥ 1.0 mm)	12.7	10.4	8.7	7.9	7.9	6.8	7.3	8.4	8.5	11.5	13.0	13.1	116.2
Mean monthly sunshine hours	70.1	89.6	134.2	202.2	235.1	237.7	251.5	232.7	176.3	121.6	78.3	62.5	1,891.8
Source 1: Met Office
Source 2: Starlings Roost Weather

== Governance ==
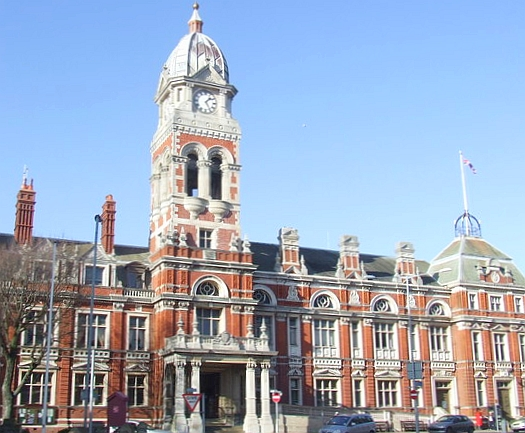
The local council operates from the town hall

There are two tiers of local government covering Eastbourne, at district and county level: Eastbourne Borough Council, based at the Town Hall on Grove Road, and East Sussex County Council, based in Lewes. There are no civil parishes in the borough, which is an unparished area.

Eastbourne was an ancient parish. It was governed by its vestry, in the same way as most rural areas until 1859, when the parish was made a local government district, governed by a local board. It become a municipal borough in 1883, governed by a body formally called the "mayor, aldermen and burgesses of the borough of Eastbourne", but informally known as the corporation or town council. One of the new council's first projects was to build Eastbourne Town Hall, which was designed by W. Tadman Foulkes, and built between 1884 and 1886 under supervision of Henry Currey, the Duke of Devonshire's architect.

In 1911, Eastbourne was elevated to be a county borough, making it independent from East Sussex County Council. Eastbourne became a non-metropolitan district on 1 April 1974 under the Local Government Act 1972, with East Sussex County Council once more providing county-level services to the town.

Local government reorganisation is being considered for the area. In July 2026, the government announced reforms across East Sussex which included abolishing Eastbourne Borough Council and creating an East Sussex unitary authority covering most of the county council's current area. In September 2026 these proposals were paused for further review.

=== National representation ===
The parliamentary constituency of Eastbourne has always covered a greater area than the borough's nine wards but, due to population growth in the town, it has lost territory over time. At present, the constituency includes all of the borough as well as the suburb of Willingdon.

Eastbourne is a marginal seat currently represented by the Liberal Democrats, but with recent representation by the Conservatives.

== Demography ==
Eastbourne is the second largest district or borough in East Sussex with an official resident population of 101,700 in the 2021 census, an increase of 2.3% over the 2011 census. Previously, the population of Eastbourne grew from 89,667 to 99,400 between 2001 and 2011.

The average age of residents has dropped in recent years, as younger people move into the town and young family households have started to balance retirement communities. In 2014, 54% of residents were between 20 and 64, while 24% were over 65 years old and there was an average age of 43. In 2013, the Office for National Statistics named an area in Meads as the first place in the UK to have an average resident age exceeding 70, with an average age of 71.1, compared with a national average age of 39.7.

A total of 29% of households do not have cars or vans.

=== Ethnic groups ===
Ethnically, the 2021 census showed the town was 90.8% White, including 82.1% White British and 7.7% Other White, down from 94.1% in 2011 and 96.6% in 2001 census. Asian people were 3.5% (up from 2.8% in 2011), 2.8% were mixed or multiple ethnic groups, 1.3% were Black, Black British, Caribbean or African and other ethnic groups were 1.7% of the total population.

The following shows the ethnic identity of residents residing in Eastbourne from 2001 to 2021, according to census data.

Ethnicity	2001		2011		2021	
Ethnicity	Number	%	Number	%	Number	%
All usual residents	89,667	100	99,412	100	101,680	100
White	86,618	96.6	93,508	94.1	92,342	90.8
White British	82,916	92.5	86,903	87.4	83,465	82.1
Other White	2,729	3.0	5,561	5.6	7,829	7.7
Asian	882	1.0	2,795	2.8	3,544	3.5
Black	341	0.4	783	0.8	1,308	1.3
Mixed or Multiple	944	1.0	1,791	1.8	2,802	2.8
Other group	882	1.0	535	0.5	1,684	1.7

=== Birthplace ===
In 2021, Eastbourne had residents from a range of birthplaces, with 82.4% born in England (down from 85.2% in 2011 census). Other notable groups of people include Poland (1.5%), Scotland (1.3%), Portugal (1.1%) and other EU countries (1.2%) that joined between 2001 to 2011.

The 2001 UK Census indicated that the largest non-white ethnic group at the time was Chinese. Studies conducted by the local council in 2008 reflected growth in new residents from Eastern Europe, particularly Poland.

Unemployment in Eastbourne was below the national average in 2013 figures, at 4.1% compared to 4.4% for England and Wales. The percentage of economically active people increased between 2001 and 2011. There has also been an upward trend in recent years, in the number of people with higher education qualifications.

== Economy ==
With a population of more than 100,000 people, Eastbourne has been a fast-growing town in the past few years, relative to the rest of the UK. Development around Eastbourne's Sovereign Harbour, Britain's largest composite marina, has created more than 3,000 new homes and an innovation centre for small businesses.

The town is home to companies in a wide range of industries. Eastbourne's Chamber of Commerce has more than 500 members and holds many networking events to facilitate local business links.

In 2008, Eastbourne was judged to have low productivity, in a national assessment by the National Audit Office. Productivity, measured by gross value added per employee, was recorded as £31,390 per year. This compared unfavourably with the South East overall, where GVA was £40,460 per employee per year. A possible explanation for this is that a high proportion of workers are in sectors which have relatively low productivity and wages.

In recent years, five areas within Eastbourne have regularly featured in the most economically deprived 10% in all of England. Measured as Lower Layer Super Output Areas (LSOAs), two areas within Devonshire ward, two areas within Hampden Park, and one area within Langney, are all among the most deprived LSOAs in the country. Three quarters of LSOAs in the town (45 LSOAs or 76%) had a worse ranking for deprivation in 2010 than in 2007.

=== Technology and creative sectors ===
In 2016, UK innovation charity NESTA named Eastbourne as a "creative cluster", with 969 creative firms representing 9.1% of total businesses in the town and providing employment for 2,703 people.

=== Tourism sector ===
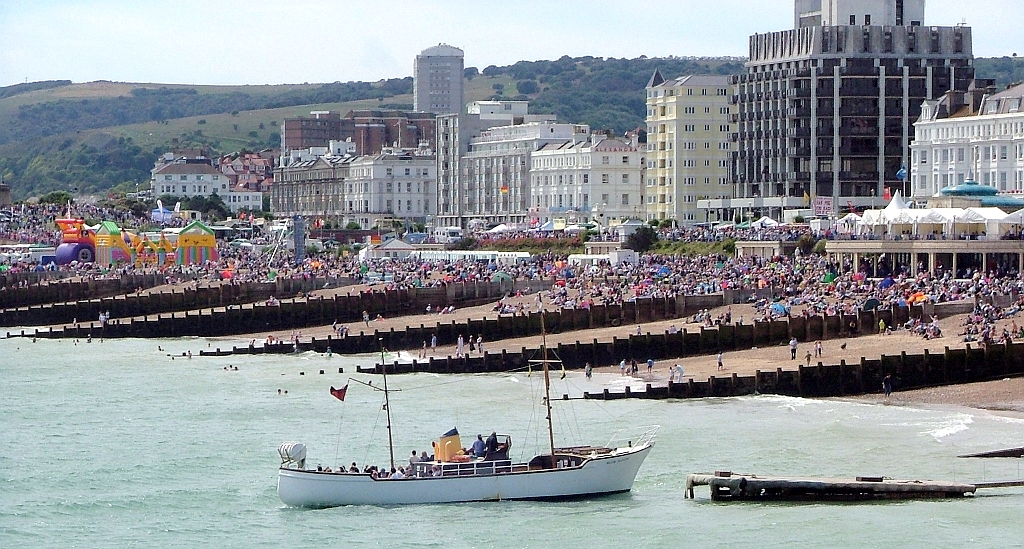
The beach and parade, with Beachy Head in the background (August 2005)

The seafront at Eastbourne consists almost entirely of Victorian hotels. Along with its pier and bandstand, this serves to preserve the front in a somewhat timeless manner. The Duke of Devonshire retains the rights to the seafront buildings and does not allow them to be developed into shops.

A stretch of 4 miles (6.4 km) of shingle beach stretches from Sovereign Harbour in the east to Beachy Head in the west. In a 1998 survey, 56% of visitors said that the beach and seafront was one of Eastbourne's best features, although 10% listed the pebbled beach as a dislike.

Other recreation facilities include two swimming pools, three fitness centres and other smaller sports clubs, including scuba diving.

A children's adventure park is sited at the eastern end of the seafront. There are various other establishments scattered around the town such as crazy golf, go–karting and Laser Quest. The pier is an obvious place to visit and is sometimes used to hold events, such as the international birdman competition held annually, although this was cancelled in 2005 due to a lack of competitors. An annual raft competition used to take place where competitors, usually local businesses, circumnavigate the pier in a raft made by themselves, while being attacked by a water-cannon.

A major event in the tourist programme of the borough council is Eastbourne Airbourne, a large air show held annually in August.

Reports claim a £365 million revenue from visitors in 2010, with an estimated 7,160 jobs supported by tourism.

=== Large employers ===
The town is home to the UK's largest book wholesalers, Gardners Books, which is one of the town's largest employers, with a majority of staff involved in packing and shipping books from a 350,000 square feet (33,000 m^{2}) warehouse facility.

A majority of Eastbourne's total employment is offered by small private businesses, though Eastbourne District General Hospital is a significant public sector employer.

In 2010, it was assessed that Eastbourne had a public sector employment rate of 25.4% of overall jobs. This was noted as below average, compared with the UK as a whole.

=== Electricity supply ===
Eastbourne Electric Light Co. started up on 4 September 1882 illuminating The Parades with 22 Brush arc lamps. Several large shops were lit with incandescent lamps powered from generators located at the Bedfordwell waterworks. An alternating current system was introduced in 1883, from a generating plant at The Old Brewery in Junction Road. By 1888, there were 1,700 lamps on the system; a new generating plant was added in 1899 including 30 kW, 75 kW, 100 kW, 50 kW, 150 kW and 200 kW generators. There were five circuits distributing electricity around the town through rubber insulated cables. After a few years, the rubber deteriorated and faults were frequent. The Eastbourne Corporation purchased the undertaking on 1 January 1900 and the original electricity works was closed down in July 1902.

Eastbourne County Borough Corporation began construction of Eastbourne power station in the first decade of the twentieth century. It supplied electricity, firstly for street lighting then other uses. The station had a single brick chimney and three wooden cooling towers. Upon nationalisation of the electricity industry in 1948, ownership of the station passed to the British Electricity Authority and then to the Central Electricity Generating Board. In 1954 the station generated 2,652 MWh of electricity and burned 3,500 tons of coal. In 1966, the power station had a generating capacity of 9.0 MW and delivered 3,165 MWh of electricity. The CEGB later closed the station and it was subsequently demolished.

== Education ==
Eastbourne's reputation for health, enhanced by bracing air and sea breezes, contributed to the establishment of many independent schools in the 19th century. In 1871, the year which saw the arrival of Queenwood Ladies College, the town was just beginning a period of growth and prosperity. By 1896, Gowland's Eastbourne Directory listed 76 private schools for boys and girls; however, economic difficulties during the inter-war years saw a gradual decline in the number of independent schools.

In 1930, the headmistress of Clovelly-Kepplestone, a well-established boarding school for girls, referred to "heavy financial losses experienced by schools in the past few years." In 1930, this school was forced to merge its junior and senior departments; in 1931, one of its buildings was sold off, and in 1934 the school closed altogether. Finally, indicative of the changes that would later befall many of the larger buildings in the town, the school was demolished to make way for a block of flats, which was completed in 1939.

The Eastbourne (Blue Book) Directory for 1938 lists 39 independent schools in the town. With the fall of France in June 1940, and the risk of invasion, most left – the majority never to return. By 2020, the number had reduced to just three: St. Andrew's Prep, Eastbourne College and Bede's School.

Eastbourne has 17 state primary and six secondary schools, with one primary and two secondary special schools. Parts of the University of Brighton were based in the Meads area of the town. There are several language colleges and schools, with students coming mainly from Europe.

East Sussex College is a large further education college with a campus in Eastbourne. This state-funded college provides a range of GCSE, GCE A Level, BTEC and vocational programmes for students aged 16–19 years of age, plus a full range of adult FE programmes. It originated from a 2001 merger between Lewes Tertiary College and Eastbourne College of Arts and Technology (ECAT) to form Sussex Downs College, which then took over Park College (the former Eastbourne sixth form college) in 2003. In 2018, a further merger with Sussex Coast College in Hastings formed the current East Sussex College.

== Health and emergency services ==
The town is served by Eastbourne District General Hospital, part of East Sussex Healthcare NHS Trust. As of 2014, the maternity unit of the hospital has been permanently transferred to the Conquest Hospital, Hastings after years of campaigning to save the unit.

An earlier hospital, St Mary's, opened on Vicarage Road in 1877 as the infirmary to the local workhouse; it was demolished in 1990.

Eastbourne fire station is in Whitley Road. The town's police station is at 1 Grove Road, formerly at no. 64. In 2020, planning permission was granted to convert the old police station for residential use. As of 2026, the building was being marketed for £3.5 million. Eastbourne has an RNLI lifeboat station. A new boat named Diamond Jubilee was launched in 2012 by the Earl and Countess of Wessex.

Eastbourne Blind Society was founded in 1923, with a centre opened on Longstone Road in 1963; in 2018, the society had almost 800 members.

== Transport ==
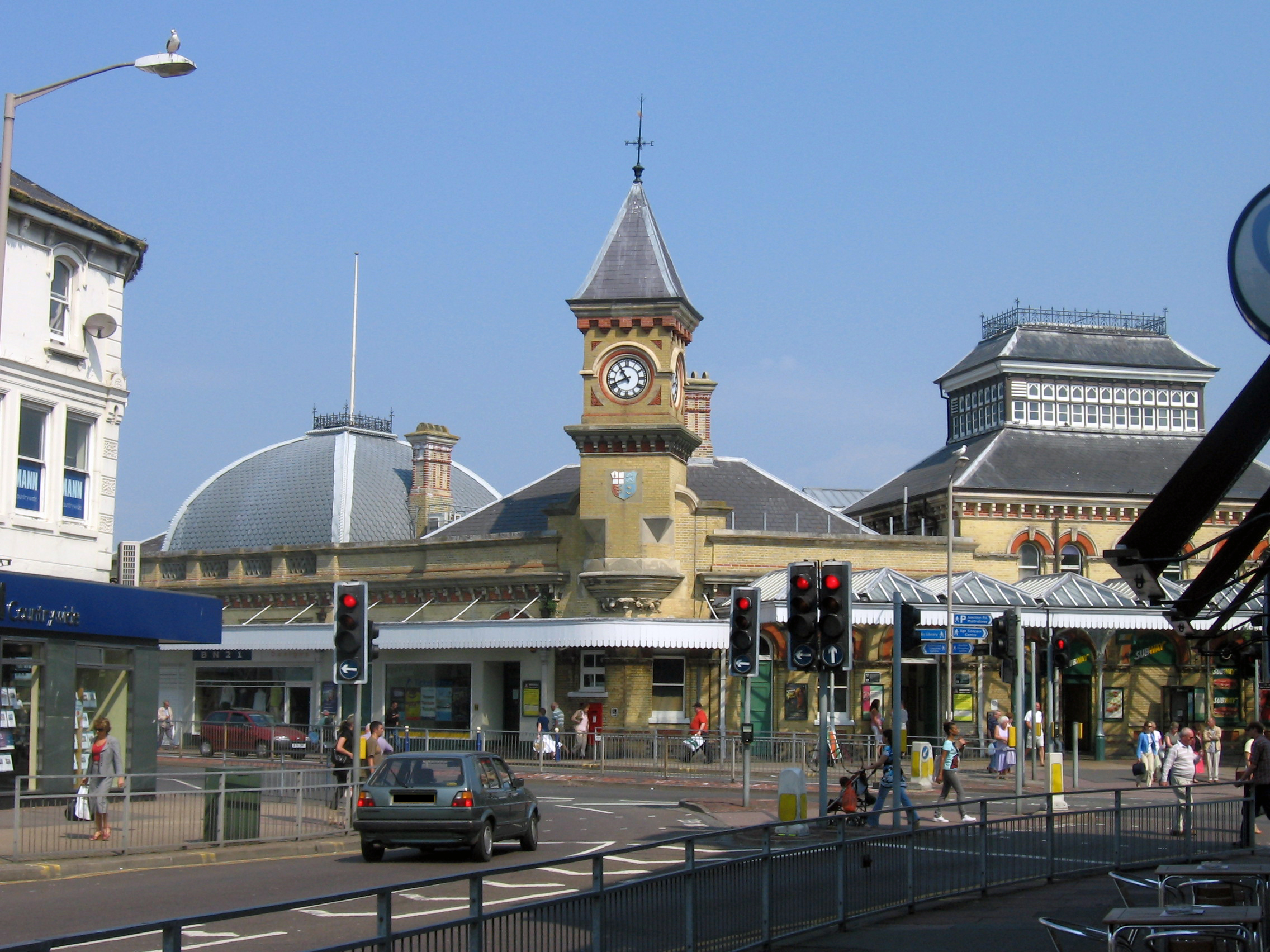
The town's railway station

Eastbourne railway station is situated in the town centre, with services operated by Southern. Regular services connect the town with London Victoria, Gatwick Airport, Hastings, Ashford International and Brighton. Services to London take around 1hr 35mins.

The town is connected by road to London by the A22, and to Brighton and Hove and Hastings by the nearby A27. It is the largest town in Britain with no direct dual-carriageway link to the national motorway network. (Note: Eastbourne is followed by Southport and Bath in the list.) The car is the most used form of transport in the town, with only 6% of journeys taken by bus; the local council transport plan aims to reduce the amount of car usage.

Bus services within Eastbourne have been provided by Stagecoach Group under the name Stagecoach in Eastbourne since November 2008, when the company acquired Eastbourne Buses, which was the town's municipal bus company, and subsequently Cavendish Motor Services. As well as local journeys within the town, Stagecoach also operates routes to Polegate, Hailsham, Royal Tunbridge Wells, Uckfield and East Grinstead, while the two routes to Hastings via Bexhill are run by Stagecoach South East from Hastings. The other main operator into Eastbourne is Brighton & Hove, owned by the Go-Ahead Group, which runs frequent services to and from Brighton on two routes via Seaford and Newhaven, and via Hailsham and Lewes. Limited numbers of additional services are run by the Cuckmere Buses and a regular National Express coach service operates daily from London's Victoria Coach Station.

A miniature tramway once ran a mile across "the Crumbles" (then undeveloped) from near Princes Park/Wartling Road towards Langney Point. It opened in 1954 but ceased operations in 1970, relocating to Seaton, in Devon, after the owners had fallen out with the council; it is now the Seaton Tramway.

== Parks and gardens ==
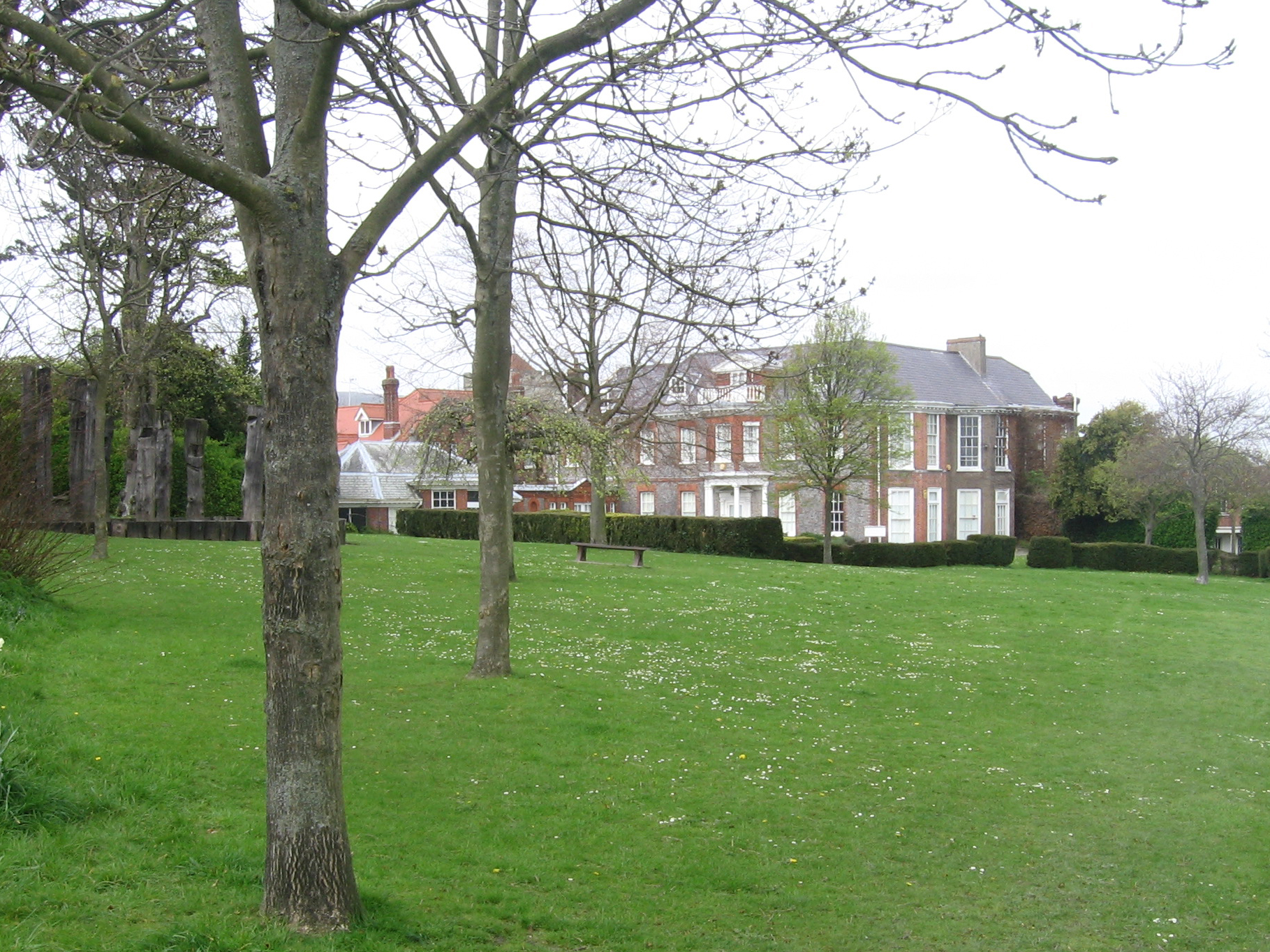
Manor Gardens, a small park adjoining Gildredge Park and containing Manor House (1776)

Eastbourne has numerous parks and gardens, although there are several smaller open spaces including Upperton Gardens, the Carpet Gardens and the Western Lawns. The first public park in Eastbourne was Hampden Park, originally owned by Lord Willingdon and opened on 12 August 1902.

Facilities include: football pitches, rugby club, indoor bowls, a large lake (formerly a Decoy pond), lakeside cafe, children's recreation area, tennis courts, BMX and skate facility, disc golf course (target) and woodland. The largest and newest park is Shinewater Park, located on the west side of Langney and opened in 2002. There is a large fishing lake, basketball, football pitches, a BMX and skate park and children's playground.

Gildredge Park is a large open park located between the town centre and Old Town; it is popular with families and has a children's playground, cafe, tennis courts, disc golf course and bowls lawns. The smaller, adjoining Manor Gardens combines both lawns and shady areas as well as a rose garden. Until 2005, Manor Gardens was the home of the Towner Gallery. This gallery incorporated a permanent exhibition of local art and historical items, plus temporary art exhibitions of regional and national significance. It was relocated to a new, £8.6 million purpose-built facility adjacent to the Congress Theatre, Devonshire Park which opened on 4 April 2009.

Princes Park obtained its name during a visit by the Duke of Windsor as Prince of Wales in 1931. Located at the eastern end of the seafront, it has a children's playground with paddling pool, cafe, bowls and a large lake, noted for its swans. The lake is used by a nearby water-sports centre, which offers kayak and windsurfing training. Princes Park lake is also home to Eastbourne Model Powerboat Club and Eastbourne Model Yacht Club. Close by are tennis and basketball courts and a football pitch. At the north of the park is the Oval, home of Eastbourne United F.C.

On 21 July 2018, the park hosted the town's second LGBTQ+ Pride event which was attended by over 4,000 people.

Devonshire Park, home to the pre-Wimbledon ladies tennis championships, is located just off the seafront in the town's cultural district. Other parks include: Helen Gardens and the Italian Gardens at the western end of the seafront, Sovereign Park between the main seafront and the marina and Motcombe Gardens in Old Town.

Eastbourne's floral displays have been promoted, including the Carpet Gardens along the coastal road near the pier. The displays, and the town, have won the award the 'Coastal Resort B' category in the 2003 Britain in Bloom competition.

== Landmarks ==
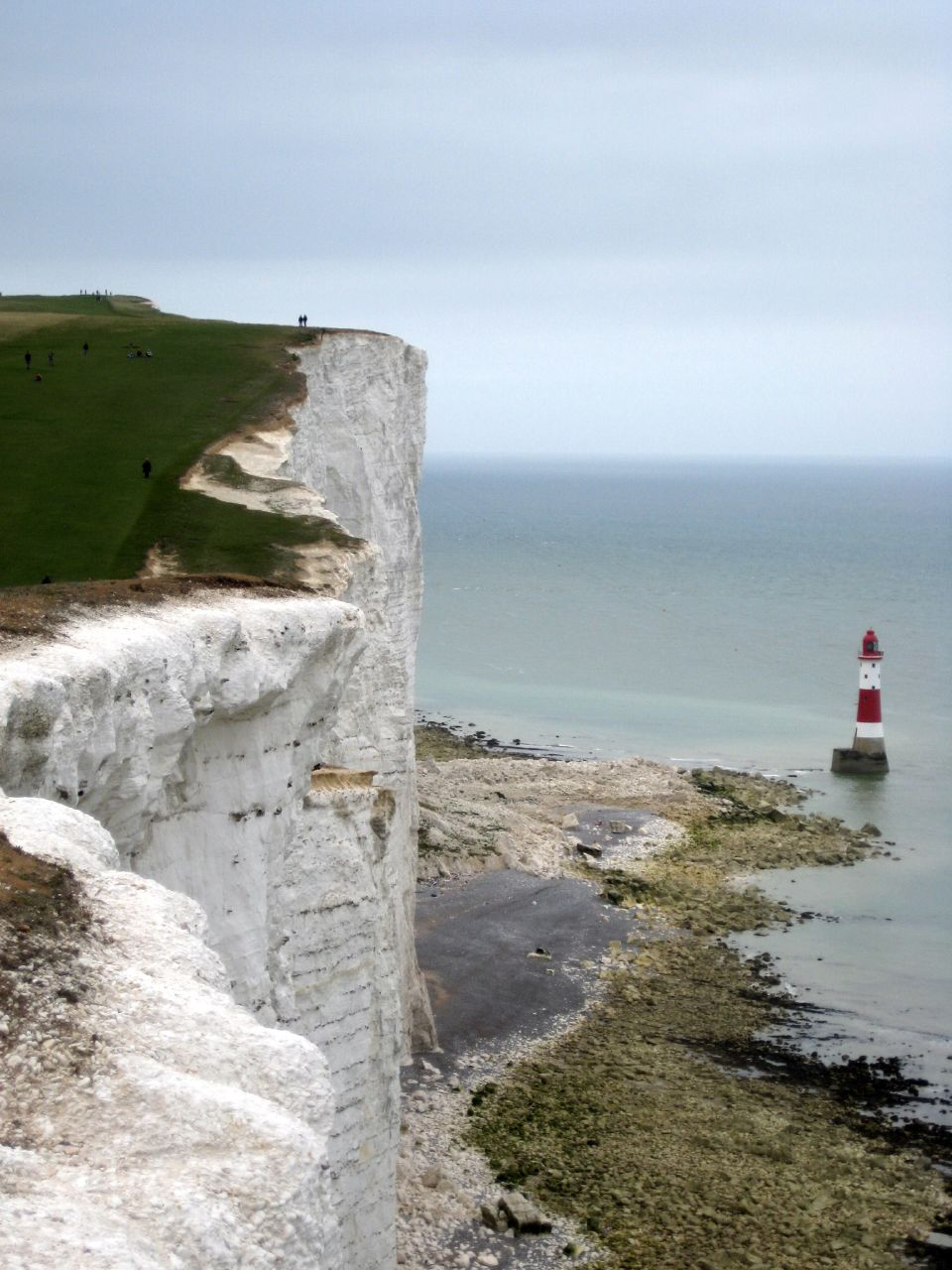
Beachy Head and lighthouse, one of the town's landmarks

=== Beachy Head and the Downs ===
The Eastbourne Downland is an area of farmland and downland covering approximately 4,000 acres that overlooks the town. It has been owned by the Borough of Eastbourne since the Eastbourne Corporation Act 1926, which was intended to protect the land's natural character "in perpetuity".

The Eastbourne Downs include Beachy Head cliff, to the west of the town, a famous beauty spot and an infamous suicide spot. Statistics are not officially published to reduce suicidal mimicry, but unofficial statistics show it to be the third most common suicide spot.

In early 2026, the beach was covered with chips and onions. This was most likely caused by two containers falling overboard from different cargo ships while encountering stormy weather. A cleanup operation began in January 2026. According to reports, thousands of bags of chips were washed ashore, and volunteers were asked to join the cleanup effort through social media.

The lighthouse at the foot of the cliff came into operation in October 1902. Although originally staffed by two keepers, it has been remotely monitored by Trinity House via a landline since June 1983. Prior to its construction, shipping had been warned by the Belle Tout Lighthouse on the cliff top some 1,640 yards (1,500 m) to the west. Belle Tout Lighthouse was operational from 1834 to 1902, and closed because its light was not visible in mist and low cloud. It became a private residence, but was severely damaged in the Second World War by Canadian artillery. In 1956, it was rebuilt as a house and remains a dwelling to this day. In March 1999, the structure was moved 55 feet (17 m) back from the cliff edge to save it from plunging into the sea. The structure may need to be moved again to safeguard it from cliff erosion.

=== Eastbourne Pier ===
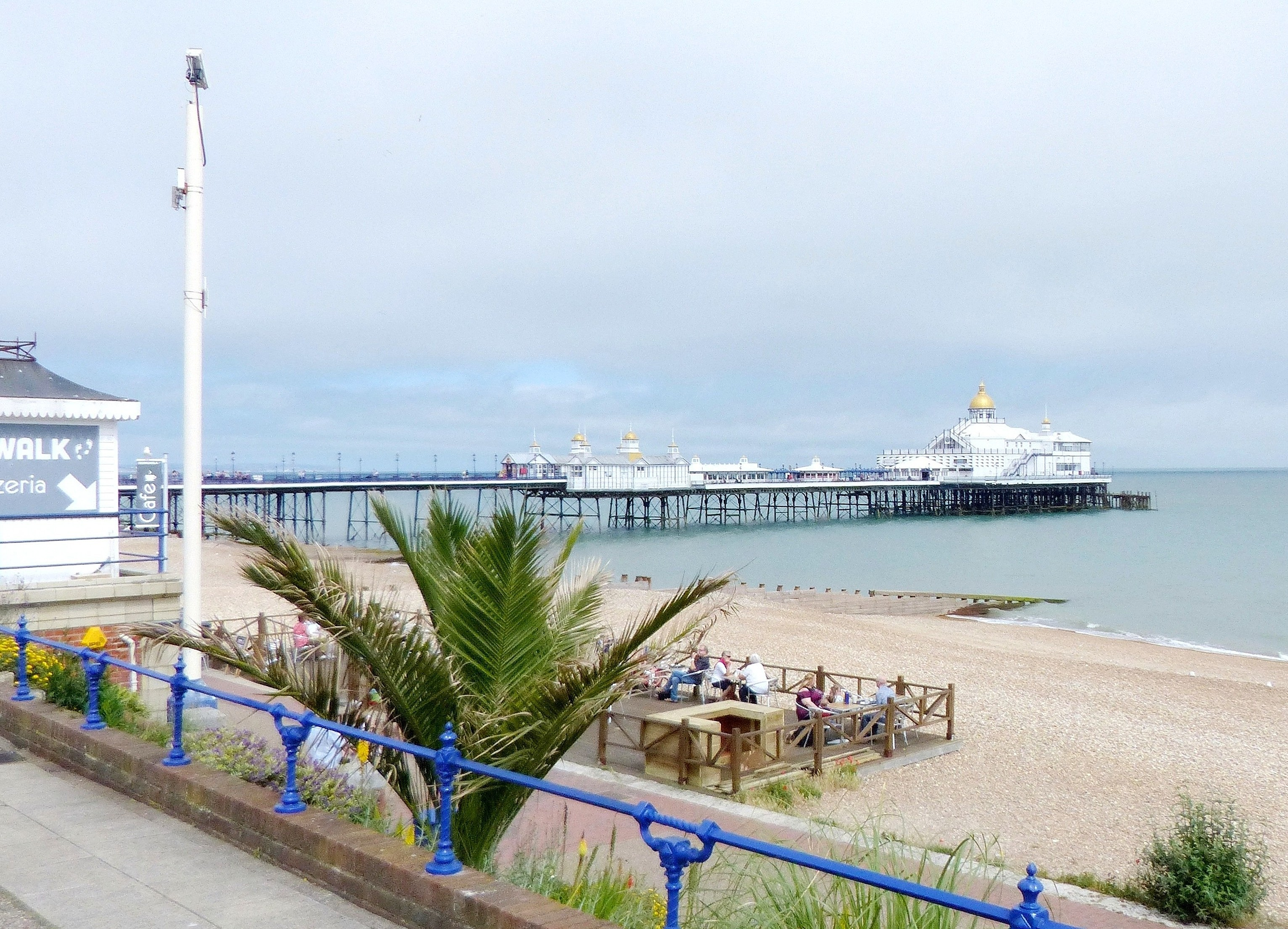
The pier in June 2018

Eastbourne Pier was built between 1866 and 1872 at the junction of Grand and Marine Parades. The pier interrupts what would otherwise have been a ribbon development of buildings: high-class hotels to the west, with modest family hotels and boarding houses to the east. The Eastbourne Pier Company was registered in April 1865, with a capital of £15,000 and work began on 18 April 1866. It was opened by Lord Edward Cavendish on 13 June 1870, although it was not actually completed until two years later.

On New Year's Day 1877, the landward half was swept away in a storm. It was rebuilt at a higher level, creating a drop towards the end of the pier. It is effectively built on stilts, that rest in cups on the sea-bed allowing the whole structure to move during rough weather. It is roughly 300 metres (980 ft) long. A domed 400-seater pavilion was constructed at a cost of £250 at the seaward end in 1888. A 1,000-seater theatre, bar, camera obscura and office suite replaced this between 1899 and 1901. At the same time, two saloons were built midway along the pier. Access to the camera obscura was destroyed by an arson attack in 1970, but was restored in 2003 with a new stairway built.

==== Pier fire ====
On 30 July 2014, a fire broke out in the middle building of the pier. BBC News reported that 80 firefighters attended the scene. One third of the pier was badly damaged.

On 19 August 2014, a worker from Cumbria died after falling through the decking of the damaged pier.

Central government paid Eastbourne Borough Council £2 million in one-off funding, to compensate for lost income to the town from the temporary loss of the attraction. The council spent this on a variety of projects and events in the hope of boosting the local economy.

=== Eastbourne Redoubt ===
Eastbourne Redoubt on Royal Parade is one of three examples of a type of fortress built to withstand potential invasion from Napoleon's forces in the early 19th century. It houses collections from the Royal Sussex Regiment, the Queen's Royal Irish Hussars and the Sussex Combined Services Collection; including four Victoria Crosses and General Hans-Jürgen von Arnim's Steyr Automobile 1500A Afrika Korps staff car.

== Religion ==
As well as the medieval parish church of St Mary in Old Town, another church building in Eastbourne is the redbrick St Saviour's and St Peter's. Originally consecrated under the former name in 1872, it was designed by George Edmund Street but merged with St Peter's in 1971 when the latter was made redundant and demolished. The Catholic Church of Our Lady of Ransom is a generously proportioned building with a tall Gothic interior. One of the windows commemorates the exiled Polish-Lithuanian nobleman, Prince Lev Sapieha, who lived in the town, and there is much other artwork in the building. The recently formed Personal Ordinariate of Anglicans reconciled to the Catholic Church meets at St Agnes, another Victorian Gothic building.

The tall flint tower of St Michael's at Ocklynge is one of Eastbourne's landmarks. The church was consecrated in 1902 and built on the site of the mission hall where the nonsense writer Lewis Carroll (the clergyman CL Dodgson) is known to have preached during his holidays in the town. All Souls, in Italian style, is a finely proportioned building with an Evangelical church tradition. Holy Trinity also has a strong history of Evangelism, particularly during the early 20th century when Canon Stephen Warner was the vicar for 28 years. There is a Greek Orthodox Church converted from a 19th-century Calvinistic chapel.

The Strict Baptist Chapel in Grove Road is an interesting building, despite its rather grim street frontage. The United Reformed Church in Upperton Road has tall rogue Gothic windows set in red brick walls. Several other denominations have similarly interesting church buildings, including some of 20th century design, such as the Baptist Church in Eldon Road.

The copyrights of many well-known hymns and contemporary worship songs used in churches around the world were handled by Kingway's Thankyou Music of Eastbourne, also known as Integrity Music. They moved to Brighton in 2019.

There is a tradition of Judaism in Eastbourne and a Jewish rest home.

The Islamic community uses a small mosque that was formerly the Seeboard social club.

== Culture ==
=== Towner Art Gallery ===
The Towner Art Gallery is the town's principal arts gallery and arts education hub. After being located in Eastbourne Manor House for many years, within Gildredge Park, it relocated next to the Congress Theatre in 2009. The gallery holds one of the most important collections of public art in southern England. The venue hosted the 2023 Turner Prize.

=== Theatres ===
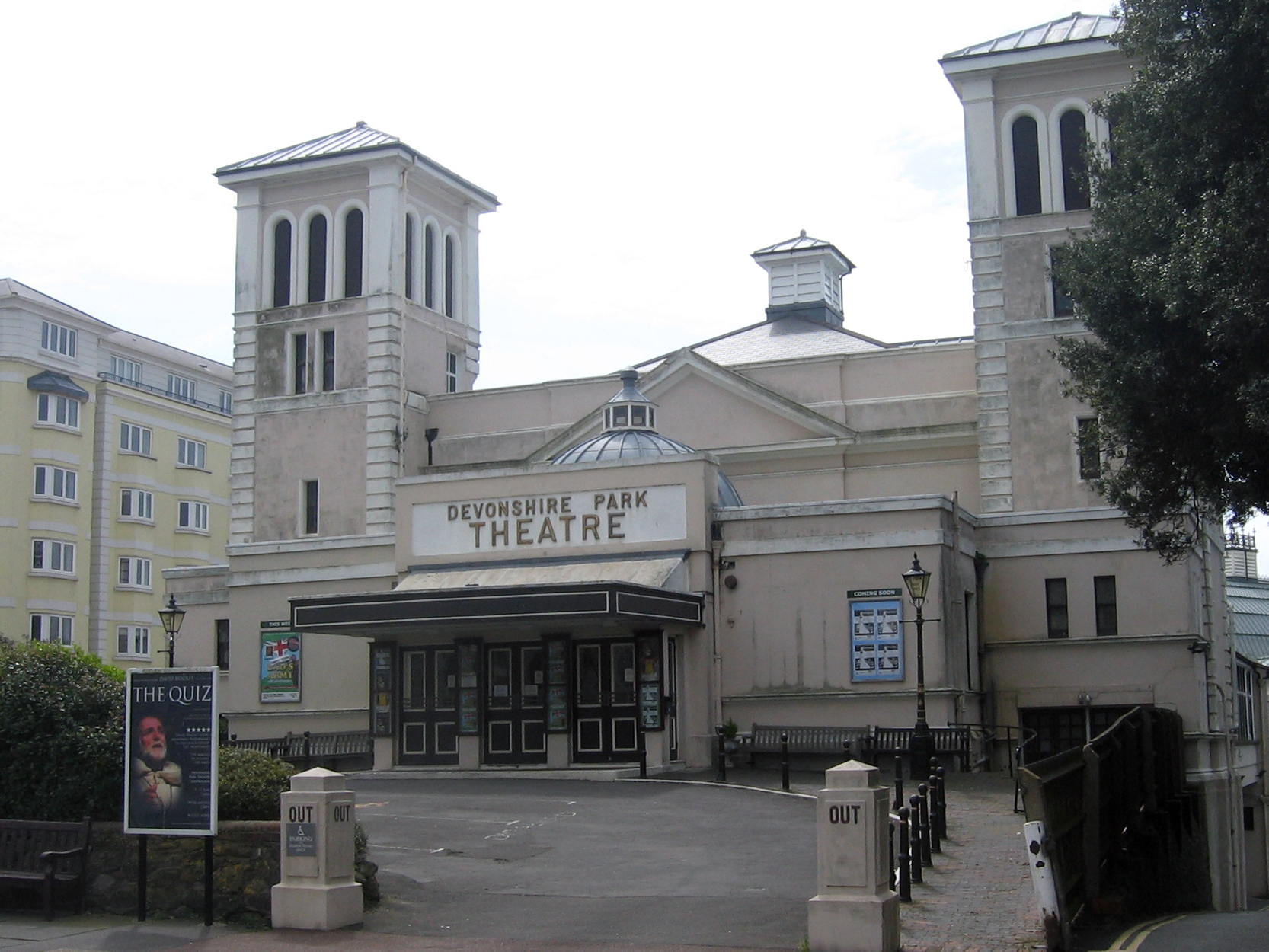
Devonshire Park Theatre, completed in 1884

Eastbourne has three council-owned theatres: the Grade II* listed Congress Theatre, the Grade II listed Devonshire Park Theatre and the Grade II listed Winter Garden. The Grade II listed Royal Hippodrome Theatre used to be council-owned, but is now run by an independent charitable trust.

The Devonshire Park Theatre is a fine example of a Victorian theatre with ornate interior decorations, and plays host to touring dramas and comedies and an annual local pantomime. The Royal Hippodrome has the longest running summer show in Britain. The London Philharmonic Orchestra makes regular appearances and has an annual season at the Congress Theatre.

Other theatre venues in the town include the:

- Underground Theatre, which is volunteer-run and is located in the basement of the town's Central Library
- Lamb Theatre, based at the Lamb Inn in Old Town, which was launched in August 2009 but reinstated an older tradition at the pub.

=== Cinemas ===
Eastbourne has one cinema, but used to have another:

- Cineworld is a large Multiplex cinema with eight screens, in the Beacon shopping centre.
- The Curzon was a small, family-run cinema in Langney Road, in the town centre, which closed in January 2020.

In 2013, the owners of the Curzon Cinema declared themselves "shocked" at the threats to their venue from a newly announced eight-screen multiplex, to be built in a renovated Arndale Centre nearby (the centre has been renamed as The Beacon).

=== Festivals and fairs ===
Cultural events are held in the town every year, including Airbourne, Eastbourne's International Airshow, one of the most popular in the United Kingdom. The Eastbourne Music & Arts Festival, a competitive festival held annually at the Winter Gardens, was originally founded in 1961 and changed its name in 2021 into Eastbourne Performing Arts Festival.

Other more recent festivals and fairs include:

- Eastbourne Feastival, a family, food, music and culture festival which has been held annually since 2016.
- Crossing the Screen International Film Festival, the longest running film festival of Eastbourne, founded in 2016.
- Eastbourne Steampunk Festival. Organised by Eastbourne's Bonfire Society since 2016 and celebrating retro-futuristic technology and aesthetics.
- Eastbourne Vintage Festival, created in 2021 and held in Gildredge Park, one of the town's most beautiful parks.

=== Music venues ===
Eastbourne bandstand lies on the seafront, between the Wish Tower and the pier. It stages 1812 Firework Concerts, rock and roll nights, Big Band concerts, promenade concerts and tribute bands.

There was once a second similar bandstand, also built in 1935, in the music gardens near the Redoubt Fortress. It was removed to make way for the Pavilion Tearooms (now The Glass House), but the colonnades built around it are still extant behind the tea rooms. Before 1935, each of these sites had a smaller birdcage bandstand; the one in the music gardens having been moved from a rather precarious position opposite the Albion Hotel. The kiosk in the music gardens was originally one of the toll kiosks at the entrance to the pier.

Grove Road is the location of two independent record shops and a venue called Printer's Playhouse, which hosts performances of live music and new plays.

=== In popular culture ===
The seafront and the iconic cliff at Beachy Head has been used for many scenes in feature films, and the local council set up a film liaison unit to encourage and facilitate the shooting of film sequences in and around the town.

The 2006 Academy Award-nominated film Notes on a Scandal includes scenes filmed at Beachy Head, Cavendish Hotel and 117 Royal Parade. Beachy Head and the Seven Sisters were used as backdrops for scenes from the Quidditch World Cup in Harry Potter and the Goblet of Fire.

Scenes from Half a Sixpence (1967) were filmed on the pier and near to the bandstand. The seafront area was also used for the film Angus, Thongs and Perfect Snogging directed by Gurinder Chadha.

The Langham Hotel was a filming location for Made in Dagenham, which also featured the seafront and pier.

In the musical version of Made in Dagenham, there is a song entitled Viva Eastbourne. A sequence of a rainy day at the seaside for the Doel family has as its backdrop the Wish Tower, the bandstand, the Cavendish Hotel and the pier in the 1987 British/American drama film 84 Charing Cross Road directed by David Jones.

The ending to Quadrophenia was also filmed on Beachy Head.

Television too has used Eastbourne as a backdrop. The series Little Britain had the character Emily Howard strolling along the promenade.

Other brief appearances were made in the television series Agatha Christie's Marple, The Two Ronnies, French and Saunders and Foyle's War. A sequence of sketches that appear in each episode of Bang, Bang, It's Reeves and Mortimer, was shot in the old Jo Pip's / Cunninghams theatre venue on Seaside Road, which has since been developed into flats. The 1993 BBC drama series Westbeach was filmed on location in Eastbourne and surrounding areas.

In 2021, Netflix series The Crown filmed an episode in the town and surrounding areas.

Eastbourne features in the ghost story Owen Wingrave by American novelist Henry James.

The elderly female residents of Eastbourne were the inspiration for the song "Eastbourne Ladies" by English singer Kevin Coyne, which appeared on his 1973 album Marjory Razorblade.

== Media ==
The local radio station Seahaven FM on 95.6 FM and online is now the most local radio station to cover Eastbourne. Former local radio station Sovereign FM became More Radio Eastbourne in 2016, broadcasting to Eastbourne from studios in Burgess Hill. Storm FM UK is an Eastbourne-based internet only radio station serving the coastal area and with a global outlook broadcasting to over eighty countries.

Regional radio stations, Heart South, (previously Southern FM) has, since mid 2019, been networked from London and no longer has a Sussex base, which was previously in Portslade and BBC Radio Sussex which broadcasts from Brighton.

BBC South East Today and ITV News Meridian are the two regional news programmes.

The town has three local newspaper:

- Eastbourne Herald, which is published every Friday; it is known locally as "The Herald"
- Eastbourne Scoop, a weekly on-line only media publication
- Eastbourne News is a free community newspaper, which is available to pick up from supermarkets and a variety of smaller local outlets.

== Sport and leisure ==
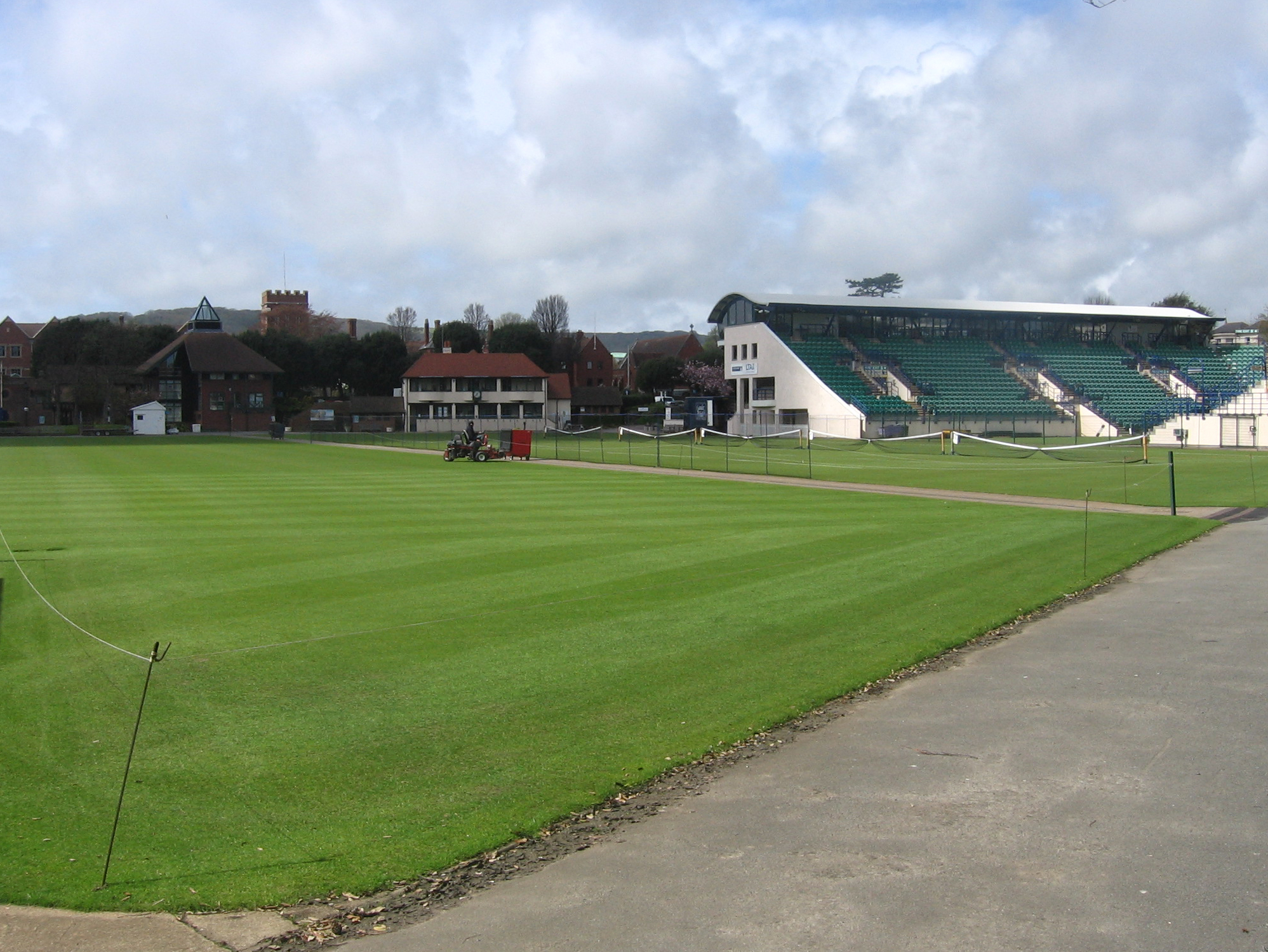
Devonshire Park Lawn Tennis Club, opened in 1874

Devonshire Park is the venue for the Eastbourne International, a tennis tournament held in the town since 1974; it serves as a warm-up to the Wimbledon Championships. Previously a women-only tournament, the Lawn Tennis Association merged it in 2009 with the men-only Nottingham Open.

Eastbourne has three senior football clubs:

- Eastbourne Borough F.C. play in the Isthmian League Premier after being relegated from the National League South in the 2025-26 season.
- Eastbourne Town F.C. play in the Isthmian League South East Division having played in the Southern Combination Football League until promotion in 2024
- Eastbourne United Association F.C. play in the Southern Combination League Premier.

Until 2021, Langney Wanderers F.C. were also in the Southern Combination League having won promotion to Division One in 2018 from playing in the local leagues.

Eastbourne is home to No. 10 Detachment, a company of the Sussex Army Cadet Force, a volunteer youth organisation, sponsored by the Ministry of Defence, which accepts cadets aged between 12 and 18 years of age. Who meet several times a week in the Army Reserve Centre near to the sea front.

Eastbourne Eagles is a speedway club located at Arlington Stadium, just outside the town. Between 1997 and 2014, it competed in the Elite League, the highest level of speedway in the UK, becoming champions in 2000. They now compete in the National League. Arlington stadium also sees stock-car racing on Wednesday evenings in the summer months.

In 1963, Chelsea College of Physical Education hosted the 1963 World Netball Tournament. It was the inaugural Netball World Cup.

Eastbourne hosted a triathlon in 2016 and 2017, which attracted professional triathletes such as Ben Allen, Jacqui Slack, Lawrence Fanous and 2012 Biathle world champion Richard Stannard in addition to the hundreds of amateurs taking part. The event takes in the town's major landmarks, including the promenade and local South Downs National Park.

Other local sports clubs include cricket, hockey, rugby, lacrosse and golf. Among the town's golf courses are the Royal Eastbourne, Eastbourne Downs, Willingdon and the Eastbourne Golfing Park. There is an annual extreme sports festival held at the eastern end of the seafront. Eastbourne Sovereign Sailing Club, on the seafront towards the eastern end, organises dinghy sailing for its members and visitors from Easter to Boxing Day and usually holds a National Championship Series for a popular UK class in the summer months.

== Notable people ==
The town can claim some notable visitors, residents and scholars:

=== Writers ===
- Lewis Carroll holidayed in Eastbourne 19 times, taking lodgings in Lushington Road, where a blue plaque now marks the location of his first visit in 1877.
- The novelist and children's writer Annie Keary died in the town in 1879.
- Poet Francis William Bourdillon lived in the town.
- Aleister Crowley, novelist, poet, occultist and mystic attended Eastbourne College and later edited a chess column for the Eastbourne Gazette.
- Novelist Angela Carter was born in Eastbourne in 1940 before moving to South Yorkshire as a child.
- Charles Webb, writer of The Graduate, moved to Eastbourne with his wife in 2006 and died there in 2020.
- Former students at the closed St Cyprian's School include George Orwell, Alaric Jacob, E. H. W. Meyerstein and Alan Hyman. The biographer and historian Philip Ziegler was also a pupil, as was the music historian Dyneley Hussey and politician, historian and diarist Alan Clark.

=== Philosophers ===
- Karl Marx and Frederick Engels often stayed in the area. Engels' ashes were scattered in the sea off Beachy Head at his request.
- The philosopher A. J. Ayer was a pupil at Ascham St Vincent's School in Carlisle Road.

=== Musicians ===
- Claude Debussy finished composing La mer at the Grand Hotel in 1905. He described Eastbourne to his publisher as "a charming peaceful spot: the sea unfurls itself with an utterly British correctness."
- The pianist Russ Conway was a resident for many years.
- Singer Leapy Lee, known for his 1968 hit song, Little Arrows, was born in Eastbourne as Graham Pulleyblank in 1939.
- Dec Cluskey from the 1960s band The Bachelors is resident in Eastbourne.
- Several bands have formed in Eastbourne, including: Toploader, Easyworld, the Divided, ROAM and Mobiles.
- Spider Stacy, member of The Pogues, was born in Eastbourne in 1958.
- David Bowie performed in the town several times. He included a mention of Eastbourne in his 1967 single, "The Laughing Gnome".

=== Scientists ===
- Michael Fish (born 1944), who forecast the weather for BBC Television from 1974 to 2004, was born in Eastbourne and studied at Eastbourne College.
- Frederick Gowland Hopkins (1861–1947), biochemist and Nobel prizewinner, was born in Eastbourne.
- "Darwin's Bulldog" Thomas Henry Huxley (1825–1895) spent the last few years of his life in Eastbourne.
- Charles Scott Sherrington (1857–1952), neurophysiologist, died in Eastbourne.
- Frederick Soddy (1877–1956), radiochemist and economist, was born in Eastbourne and studied at Eastbourne College.
- NASA aerospace engineer Bruce Woodgate (1939–2014), who attended Eastbourne Grammar School, was the principal investigator and designer of the Space Telescope Imaging Spectrograph, which was installed on the Hubble Space Telescope in 1997.

=== Explorers ===
- Polar explorer Lawrence Oates attended South Lynn School in Mill Gap Road.
- George Mallory, the noted mountaineer, attended Glengorse Preparatory School in Chesterfield Road between 1896 and 1900.
- Count László Almásy, the basis of the lead character of The English Patient, was educated by a private tutor at Berrow, and was a member of the pioneering Eastbourne Flying Club.
- In 1993, following a suggestion to Eastbourne Borough Council by Eastbourne Civic Society (now Eastbourne Society), a joint project was set up to erect blue plaques on buildings associated with famous people. The principles for selection are broadly those already established by English Heritage for such plaques in London. The first was erected in November 1994 in Milnthorpe Road at the former home of Sir Ernest Shackleton, the Antarctic explorer.

=== Visual artists ===
- The artist Eric Ravilious grew up, was educated and taught in Eastbourne.
- Artists Cedric Morris and David Kindersley attended St Cyprian's School.

=== Dramatic artists and comedians ===
- Comedian Ronald Frankau died in Eastbourne in 1951.
- Vernon Dobtcheff, Prunella Scales, Eddie Izzard, Hugh Skinner and Ed Speleers attended school in Eastbourne.
- Annie Castledine spent the end years of her life living in and working from the town.

=== Politicians ===
- Former students at St Cyprian's include Richard Wood, who had lost both legs in war, and David Ormsby-Gore, later ambassador to the USA.
- Maureen Colquhoun, later Labour MP for Northampton North, was born at Eastbourne in 1928.
- Theresa May, a former Conservative prime minister of the United Kingdom, was born in the town in 1956.
- Yvette Cooper, MP for Pontefract, Castleford and Knottingley, and Ed Balls, former MP for Morley and Outwood, married in Eastbourne in January 1998.
- Nigel Lawson, former Conservative cabinet minister and ultimately chancellor of the exchequer, died at his home at Eastbourne in 2023.

=== Others ===
- Three Victoria Cross recipients of the British Army have died at Eastbourne: Captain Henry Mitchell Jones (Crimean War) in 1916, Brigadier-General Edmond Costello (Malakand Frontier War) in 1949 and Colonel James Lennox Dawson (World War I) in 1967. In addition, two alumni of Eastbourne College have received the VC: Captain Henry Singleton Pennell (Tirah Campaign, India) and Royal Air Force Group Captain Lionel Rees (World War I).
- The leading evangelist Canon Stephen Warner was the vicar of Holy Trinity between 1919 and 1947.
- Walter Carey, previously Bishop of Bloemfontein, settled in the town where he served as chaplain of Eastbourne College.
- John Bodkin Adams, the general practitioner, convicted fraudster, and suspected serial killer, who lived and died at Eastbourne.
- Douglas Bader, who became a successful Second World War fighter pilot despite having lost both legs in a flying accident, attended Temple Grove Preparatory School in Compton Place Road.
- Percy Sillitoe, director of MI5, lived in the town in the 1950s.
- Johanna Konta, British number one tennis player and Grand Slam semi-finalist.
- Henry Allingham, briefly the world's oldest man when he died in 2009, aged 113, was a resident of the town when he was made a freeman in 2006.
- Olav Bjortomt, English international quiz player, four-time world champion (2003, 2015, 2018, 2019) and three time individual European champion (2010, 2014, 2015), was born in Eastbourne.
- Colin Perrin, award-winning commissioning editor of academic works in critical legal theory, lives in Eastbourne.
- Military figures who had been students at St Cyprian's include: General Sir Lashmer Whistler; Major General Henry Foote VC; the submarine commander Rupert Lonsdale. Other ex-students at St Cyprian's include: the amateur jockey Anthony Mildmay; Seymour de Lotbiniere, one-time Director of Outside Broadcasts at the BBC; Jagaddipendra Narayan, a reigning Maharaja of Cooch Behar while at the school.
