= Lamb Theatre =

Theatre in Eastbourne, England

Lamb Inn and Theatre Eastbourne
- The Lamb Inn, Eastbourne
- Lamb Inn and Theatre
- Interactive map of Lamb Inn and Theatre Eastbourne
- Address: 36 High Street; Eastbourne; United Kingdom
- Coordinates: 50.772611°N 0.266799°E
- Capacity: 80
- Type: fringe theatre
- Designation: Grade II Listed

Construction
- Opened: 2009

Website
- http://thelamb.eu/ www.thelambtheatre.co.uk

The Lamb Theatre is a fringe theatre, situated above the Lamb Inn in Old Town, Eastbourne. The first pub theatre in Eastbourne, it hosts a range of performance events at Eastbourne's oldest pub. The theatre was founded in August 2009, though the Lamb's roots as a performance space go much deeper; in the 19th century it was used by Augustus Egg and Charles Dickens to host their own theatrical events.

== Charles Dickens ==
Augustus Egg's portrait of Charles Dickens in an amateur performance of 'Used Up'.

The modern revival of theatrical productions at the Lamb in Eastbourne's original High Street revives a historic tradition at what was once the centre of the village's cultural and social life.

The 18th century extension of the original hostelry whose cellars date back to the 12th century was used as the Assembly Rooms of the village and theatrical productions were among the social activities which took place there. Notable amongst these were amateur dramatic productions in some of which Dickens participated.

The Blue Plaque on Pilgrims opposite - which is Eastbourne's oldest house and pre-dates the Lamb - records: "Charles Dickens made several visits to this ancient house in the 1830s." Two of his close friends were Holman Hunt the artist and Dickens who would join Egg at his summer retreat, Hunt coming over from his home in Fairlight and Dickens down from London.

Their common interest was amateur dramatics and they would rehearse their parts across the road at Pilgrims and then put on the plays either at the now disappeared theatre in South Street (taking their refreshment at the still existing Dickens Tea Rooms in South Street) or in the Assembly Rooms at the Lamb.

To mark the link between Dickens and the Lamb, actor Colin Baker read two of the author's best known stories, The Signal-Man and A Christmas Carol in December 2009.

== The theatre today ==
The theatre was revived in 2009, and had a regular programme of theatre events, usually on Sunday afternoons. Readings from authors such as Dickens, Jane Austen, Oscar Wilde and William Shakespeare have been performed on numerous occasions.
