= Shinewater =

Area of Eastbourne, East Sussex, England

Shinewater Lake. This lake was built during the 1990s in tandem with he building of the new A22 route out of Eastbourne. An important discovery was a Bronze Age implement that had been preserved in the wet fen type countryside. The channel at the top links to the Willingdon and West Langney Sewer with the lake performing a floodwater storage function for the nearby suburb of Langney.

Shinewater is a part of Langney electoral ward in Eastbourne, East Sussex. In 1995 during the clearing of the Hydneye lake a Bronze Age settlement was discovered.

The remains of a Late Bronze Age platform were uncovered after work began digging the Hydneye lake as part of wider work to alleviate potential flooding. Initially in 1995 a 50m section of the platform was found. The following year a 60m section of trackway was found.

Additional finds included a bronze sickle with intact handle and three hearths set on clay, along with pottery belonging to the Late Bronze Age post Deverel-Rimbury tradition and large numbers of stone finds.

East Sussex County Council engaged in landscaping of the area in association with opening of Golden Jubilee Way. Shinewater Park continues to be run and managed by Eastbourne Borough Council and East Sussex County Council. It won a Commendation from The Civic Trust in 2004.
