= Sovereign Harbour =

Coordinates: 50°47′25″N 0°19′47″E

- View across the North Harbour
- District: Eastbourne
- Shire county: East Sussex
- Region: South East
- Country: England
- Sovereign state: United Kingdom
- Post town: EASTBOURNE
- Postcode district: BN23
- Dialling code: 01323
- Police: Sussex
- Fire: East Sussex
- Ambulance: South East Coast
- UK Parliament: Eastbourne

Sovereign Harbour is a residential and commercial development of the shingle beachland and marsh between Eastbourne and Pevensey Bay in the seaside town of Eastbourne, England.

== History ==
The concept for the area came as a gift of the land out of private ownership and ministry of defence use. After some change in legislation, planning was given to the no man's land that existed with no public access. The possibility of housing on the site came in the early 1970s when it was considered that community design and an inclusive plan would enable the site to accommodate visitors, businesses, and homes. The commercial area for retail began trading in 1993 and today still expects some additional business and commercial entities to open.

The shingle area was formerly known as The Crumbles. Now Sovereign Harbour has a fishing quarter and boatyard, shops, restaurants and bars, alongside homes, a primary school and medical centre. The harbour is designed with five separate basins: North Harbour, South Harbour, West Harbour, Outer Harbour and Inner Harbour. The retail park has undergone a change in design since inception, and the housing projects was built in stages in differing designs, so not all blocks look the same and many different house types are included. The overall layout gives access to walk around all harbours on the waterfront, and gives access to the beach. By design Sovereign Harbour is Northern Europe's largest composite marina complex.

The marina was overseen by government regulations and sea defence planning. A high-profile and early developer was Carillion, implementing the design and concept for housing until 2007. The Harbour and boating needed professional management and the opportunity aligned with other waterside living allowed around the country. Sovereign Harbour was included in several marinas bought by the Premier Marinas group. This tied Eastbourne to other leisure and commercial marinas along the South Coast including Brighton, Chichester and Port Solent.

== The Harbours ==
View of the Inner Harbour and the Waterfront

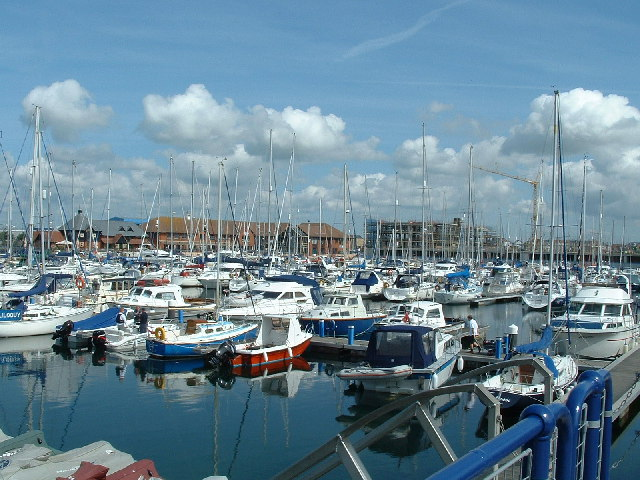
Part of the Marina (Inner Harbour)

The tidal Outer Harbour is only used for entrance to the marina through twin sea locks, which are operated 24 hours a day. It needs frequent dredging to keep the access channel from the sea to the locks open and deep enough for vessels. The local RNLI lifeboat has its own mooring there. The entrance is beside Martello Tower No.66.

All the harbours (Inner, South, West and North) are artificial and were dredged one after the other, after 1991. Behind the locks is the main marina called Inner Harbour. This is the central body of water and was the first harbour in use. It contains berths for both visiting and resident berth holders, and provides access to the other three harbours via lifting bridges. The other three are used mostly by resident berth holders and the local fishing vessels.

The North Harbour is the latest development, and is larger than the initial Inner Harbour. The two remaining harbours, West and South, are much smaller and are used by local residents owning a house/apartment around these waters.

A large boat lift now uses a corner in the North Harbour, near the local chandlery and winter storage for yachts. The locks - for access to and from the sea - and all lifting bridges are operated from the harbour office building next to the locks. The office is staffed around the clock, all days of the year. The keep listening watch is on VHF channel 17 (and not channel 80 as most marinas in the UK). Directly adjacent to the locks (and the office) is a fuel pontoon where self-service pumps for diesel and petrol are found. There is also an amenities building which provides toilets, showers and laundry facilities to visiting and resident berth holders. Visiting yachts normally contact the harbourmaster via VHF before arrival for information including tides and depths of the dredged channel.

Residential properties are about evenly split between the North and South harbours, with the waterfront (restaurants, bars, and shops) laying between them.

In the last decade of the 20th century Sovereign Harbour was clearly a project in progress, but now it is more or less completed: the local Sovereign Harbour Yacht Club has a permanent building, there is a waterfront with shops and restaurants, and most large-scale building activities are completed.

== Housing ==
Modern apartment blocks overlooking the Outer Harbour

The housing developments in the marina contain a variety of different style houses and apartments, both waterside and non-waterside. Many properties include a private mooring in one of the harbours and some provide private and direct access from the property to a private jetty.

Development began around the South Harbour and West Harbour but later extended to the land around the North Harbour and the small stretch of land between the Inner Harbour and the sea. There are now over 3,500 homes in the harbour. Most residents of the Harbour pay an annual fee to the Sovereign Harbour Trust for maintenance to the harbour, bridges, locks, cleaning the waterways and dredging the channel so boats can get in and out of the harbour. This helps pay for coastal defences as well.

== Commercial ==
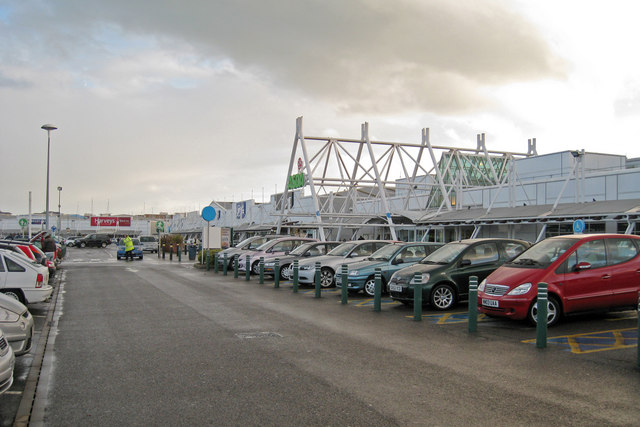
Sovereign Harbour Retail Park, known as "The Crumbles"

At the western shore of the Inner Harbour is the waterfront, with restaurants (including Harvester), coffee shops, estate agents, and chandlery. Directly behind this waterfront the large sheds are located for winter storage for yachts, and boat repair shops.

There is a commercial park directly behind the project with an ASDA supermarket, Next, Boots, and Matalan stores. All these large scale shops are built around a huge car park. It offers visitors and residents shopping options. Especially for visiting yachtsmen (without proper transport), these superstores are handy as Eastbourne town centre is a few miles away. There is a former Frankie And Benny's restaurant in its own unit on the site; this site has been bought out by a local McDonald's franchise and is soon to open a new location of the restaurant chain. Beside the commercial park, Innovation Park is being developed with various office buildings, including Pacific House. It is beside the Harbour Medical Practice, open since 2011.

Frequent bus services connect the harbour development with the centre of Eastbourne and the Seafront.

== Lifeboat ==
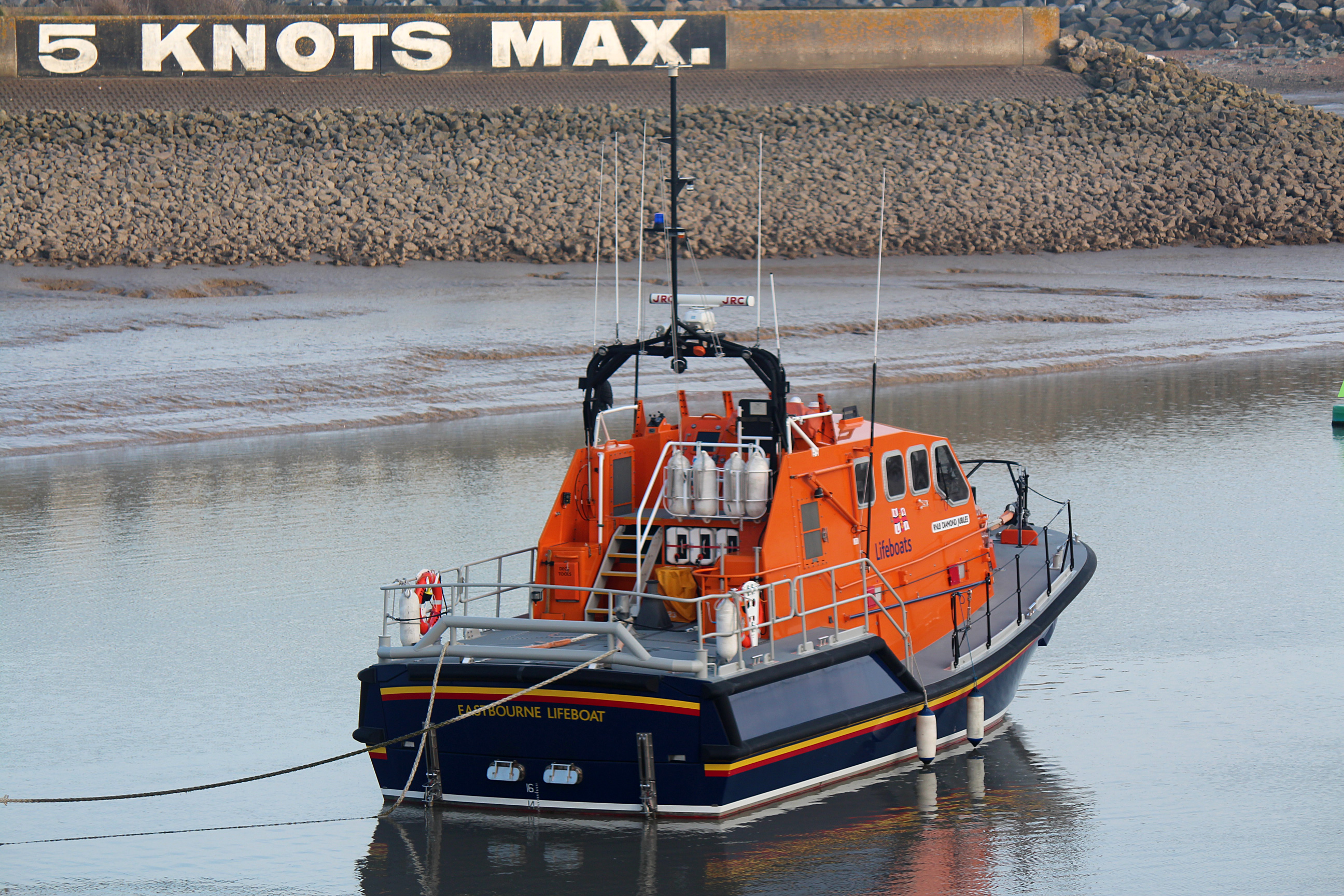
The Diamond Jubilee moored in the Outer Harbour

The marina is also the location of the Eastbourne Lifeboat. The Tamar class all-weather lifeboat, namely The Diamond Jubilee 16-23, is normally anchored in the Outer Harbour but can occasionally be seen moored in one of the locks during particularly bad weather conditions. In this case, locking procedures make sure that the lifeboat can still launch at very short notice when called out.

== Seals ==
The harbour has attracted wildlife visitors including four grey seals in 2013. Another injured seal arrived in 2015.
