= Stephen Warner =

English evangelical

The Reverend Canon Stephen Warner
- Rector of Holy Trinity, Eastbourne

Personal details
- Born: 17 January 1873 Eltham, Kent, England
- Died: 29 December 1947 (aged 74) Eastbourne, Sussex, England
- Buried: Studland, Dorset
- Children: Eileen, Eric, Geoffrey, Philip

Canon Stephen Warner (17 January 1873 – 29 December 1947) was one of Britain's leading evangelists in the first half of the 20th century and the rector of Holy Trinity, Eastbourne for 28 years.

== Early life ==
Stephen Mortimer Warner was born in Eltham, Kent on 17 January 1873. The fifth of nine children, his father Alfred was 35, a hotelier at the Craven Hotel, Craven Street, off the Strand in London; his mother Mary was 26.

== Ordination and Ministry ==
Stephen Warner attended the London College of Divinity and graduated in classics from Durham University. In 1896, he became a deacon at St Simon's church in Southsea. He was ordained a priest in 1897 and in the same year married Marion Gower Tooth, who was a cousin of Sir Robert Lucas Lucas-Tooth, 1st Baronet.
Between 1898 and 1900, he was the vicar of Savernake, near Marlborough, before spending a year at St Paul's in Poole. From 1910 to 1914, he was the vicar of Christ Church, Sandown before moving to St Paul's, Upper Norwood until 1919.
From 1919 until his death in 1947, he was the rector of Holy Trinity, Eastbourne.

== Holy Trinity, Eastbourne ==
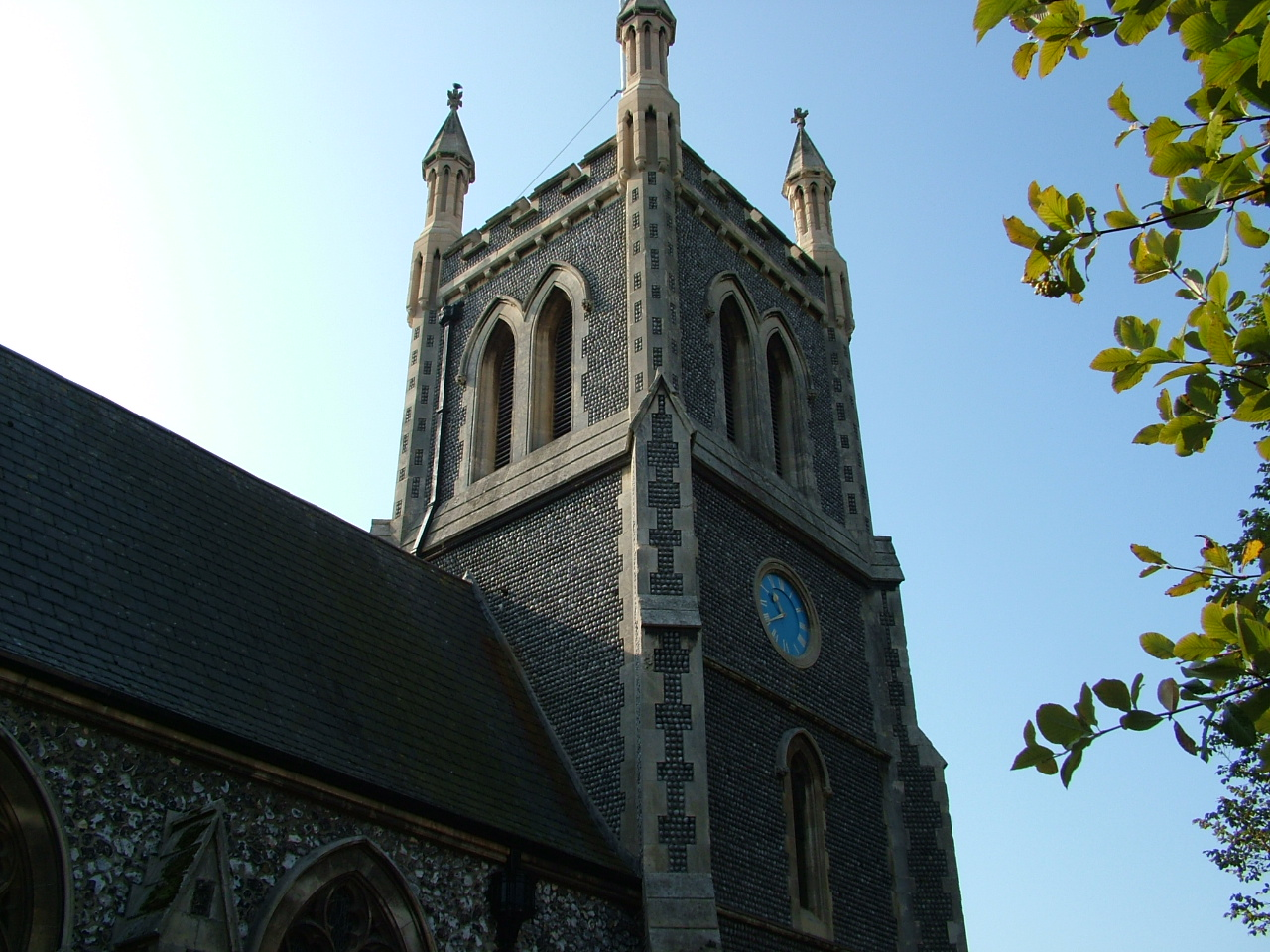
Holy Trinity, Eastbourne

Stephen Warner came to Holy Trinity, Eastbourne in 1919 and made the church a centre of Christian life and activity. His Evangelical preaching and teaching were of a missionary character and he built up a fellowship among young and old alike which had a great influence in the town among residents and visitors.

Countless numbers of people were greatly helped by his forceful Bible teachings. In addition to his sermons in the church, he held open air services on the seafront during the summer months

His influence extended far beyond Eastbourne. He had travelled all over England conducting missions and when he became Canon Warner - a prebendary of Chichester Cathedral – in 1930, he enriched the life of the diocese.

Canon Warner was later elected president of the Eastbourne branch of the CEZMS (the Church of England Zenana Missionary Society) and Hon Secretary of the annual gathering of Evangelical clergy and Laymen of the Diocese of Chichester.

His missionary work and an encompassing interest in youth organisations were, with his zeal for writing religious books, a great part of his life.

He worked very hard for the United Mission in 1923 and had previously conducted the Mission in London but these duties took their toll. On 9 December that year he was preaching in the pulpit when illness overtook him but he finished the sermon and gave out the notice of a hymn. He then asked another vicar to conduct the rest of the service, before struggling to the vestry where he collapsed.

In 1938, on the centenary of Holy Trinity, the Bishop of Leicester referred in a sermon to the great social benefits brought to Britain by the Evangelical ministry of Holy Trinity. The Bishop of Chichester praised Canon Warner's zeal as a missionary, both in Eastbourne and elsewhere.

Although Canon Warner was an excellent pastor, his forte did not necessarily lie in administration. Indeed, he used to hold PCC meetings at 6.30pm in the Vicarage so that they could be dispensed with by the time the 7.30pm dinner gong sounded.

Eastbourne was an evacuation area during the Second World War. The town suffered frequent heavy bombing attacks. Naturally, there were no holiday visitors as in peacetime. Most of the shops closed and the majority of houses stood empty. Not surprisingly the size of Trinity's congregation dropped to about 150 in the morning and 100 in the evening. Canon Warner continued his ministry with the help of a retired clergyman and also acted as an RAF honorary chaplain to the Sea Cadets.

In September 1939, quotations had been sought for removing the East window and storing it while replacing the stained glass with plain glass. The East window was comparatively new, having been given in 1934 in memory of the vicar's wife, Marion Warner, who had died that year. In the end an imaginative scheme was devised whereby the windows were left in situ but shuttered from the outside. Electric lights were placed between the shuttering and the glass. Thus the fabric was protected, ‘blackout’ preserved at evening times and the beauty of the windows could still be appreciated.

In light of the heavy ‘sneak’ raiding that Eastbourne suffered, it is quite miraculous that the church did not suffer more damage during the war. No direct hits were ‘scored’ but near misses in 1940, 1942 and 1943 did destroy all of the stained glass, except the protected East window, and damaged the roof slates and structure.

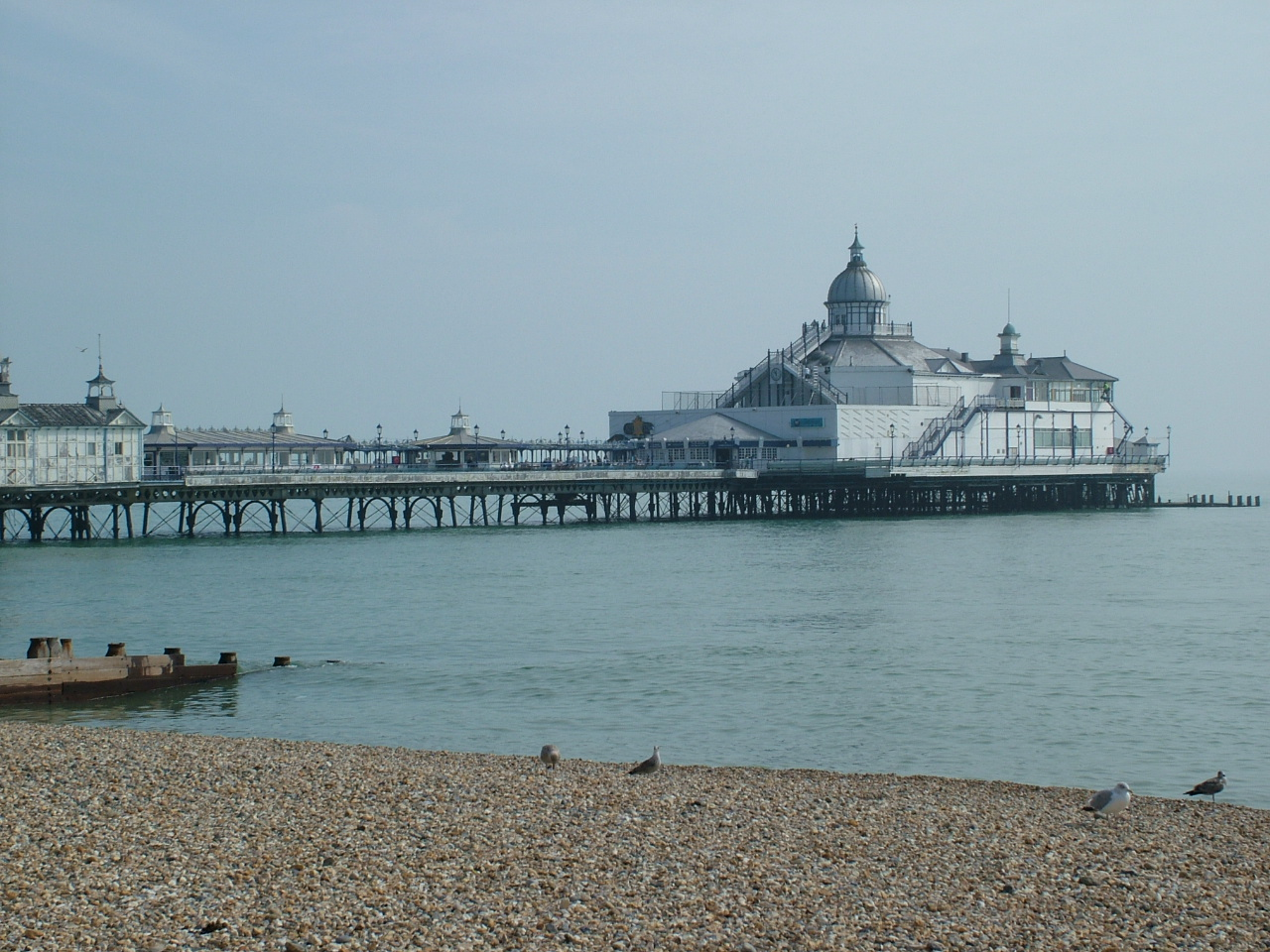
Eastbourne Seafront

As soon as the war was over, Canon ‘Beach’ Warner restarted his seafront meetings for holidaymakers. From Easter until the end of August, he would speak on the beach opposite the Burlington Hotel. In September the venue would change to outside the Lifeboat museum. A past-master at using visual aids, he would use the end of the building as a projection screen.

In September 1946, a British ‘Youth for Christ’ meeting was held in Holy Trinity Church when, at the invitation of Canon Warner, the speaker was the American evangelist Billy Graham. This was Graham's first ever speaking engagement in the UK.

The congregation was beginning to recover from the ravages of war and by Christmas 1947, Canon Warner was preaching to a packed church of around 1,200. In spite of his conviction that he would live to see the Second Coming, this was to be Canon Warner's last sermon as he died in his sleep two days later, aged 74.

A collection was made for a memorial and it was agreed to use the money partly for a window in the church and also for a project abroad. Work was well underway on a Ruanda Mission building in Ibuye, Burundi and it was decided to contribute £866 towards the building of the teaching block.

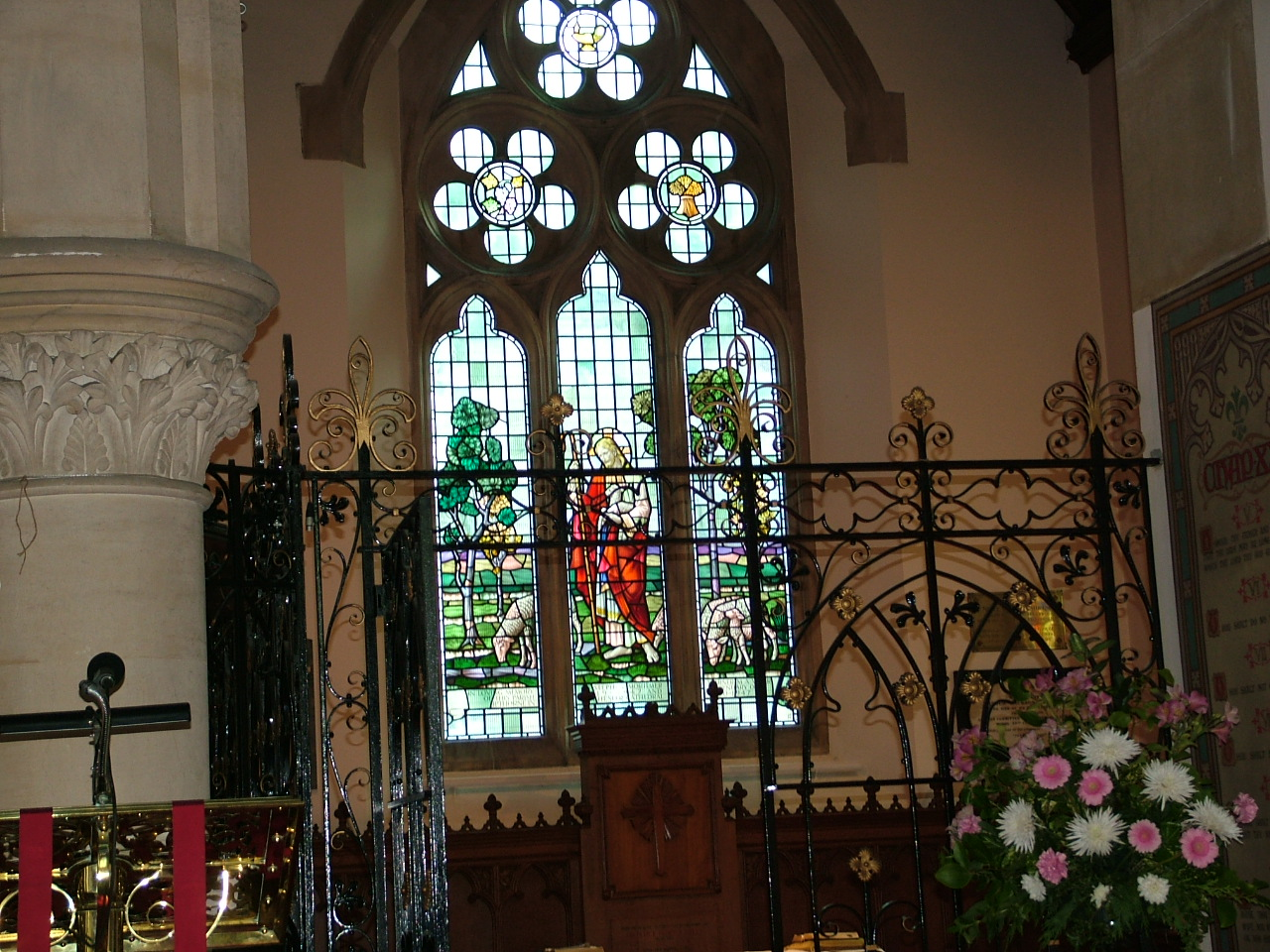
Memorial Window

Four classrooms, a hall, a staff room and a library were constructed of burnt brick with corrugated iron roofing to catch the water supply. Named ‘The Canon Warner Memorial College’, the theological college taught many ordinands, lay readers and senior evangelists over the years until political unrest put the building into disuse.

Within Holy Trinity, three new stained-glass windows were commissioned, one as a memorial to Canon Warner and two as memorials to those of the parish who had died in the two World Wars. The ‘Canon Warner’ window is in the East end of what is now the chapel. It depicts ‘Christ the Good Shepherd’ with his sheep.

== Studland ==
Studland Church

Stephen Warner had a long association with and affection for Studland village in Dorset. He first travelled there with his wife Marion while on their honeymoon in Bournemouth in January 1897. The journey involved a horse-drawn omnibus to Sandbanks, a rowing boat across the entrance to Poole Harbour and a pony trap from Shell Bay.

The following summer the couple spent their holiday in the village at Agglestone House before buying ‘Sunnyholme’ in 1901. From 1905 until 1945, Canon Warner and his family held the tenancy of the Coombe House.

Until his death in 1947, Canon Warner took the services at St Nicholas’ on many occasions when the rector was away and is buried in the churchyard.

== List of works ==
- Fifty-two steps Up the Ladder of Truth (Hodder & Stoughton, 1940)
- “The Best is Yet to Be" Studies in the Book of the Revelation (Marshall, Morgan & Scott, 1943)
- Is it True that God answers Prayer? (Church Book Room, 1935)
- There is another Spring. Studies in the “Psalms” (Dunn's of Eastbourne, 1945)
