= Hill Brow Preparatory School for Boys =

Preparatory school in England

Coordinates: 51.2401°N 2.9384°W

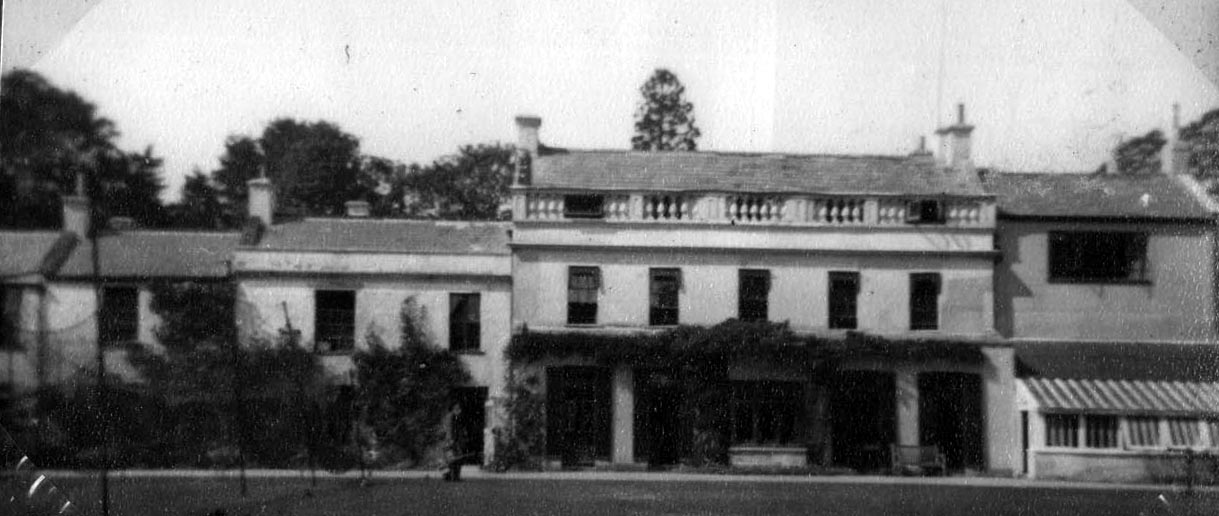
Hill Brow School (Somerset Court) South Frontage c.1957

Hill Brow Preparatory School for Boys was a small English preparatory school, initially based in Eastbourne, East Sussex, but subsequently relocated to Brent Knoll in Somerset as part of the evacuation of civilians that took place during World War II.

== History ==
Hill Brow School was restricted to boys-only and never admitted scholarship boys or others funded by the public purse on grounds of academic merit rather than the ability of their parents to pay the fees. The school accepted boys from seven years old until they took their Common Entrance exam at 13. In its later days, it accommodated between 50 and 60 boys, both boarders and day students.

In the 1890s, there was a Hillbrow Boys' Preparatory School in Rugby that was attended by Rupert Brooke from 1897 until mid-1901; however there can have been no connection between the two schools since Hill Brow School first appears in the 1893/4 edition of Pike's Eastbourne Directory located in Bolsover Road in the Meads district of Eastbourne under the headmastership of J.S. Croombe M.A..

The 1901 Eastbourne census records confirms the presence of Hill Brow School at that address and under the same headmastership, together with 13 boys aged between 9 and 14. Over the next 10 years the school doubled in size, with 24 pupils recorded in the 1911 census records but now under the headmastership of Robert Gidley Thornton (aged 42), with its erstwhile head, James Croombe (47) demoted to a position of "Asst. Master".

The next documented record of the school appears in "The Intriguing Story of Saint Christopher's Eastbourne", which records that Hill Brow School remained in Bolsover Road until June 1934 when it moved to buildings that previously housed St. Christopher's girls' school which had closed in 1932. These buildings in Gaudick Road now form the Hillbrow Campus of Brighton University.

Gowland's Eastbourne Postal & Borough 1936 Directory records that in that year the school was registered under the names of Robert Gidley Thornton and JP & F.J. Matthews MA as joint-principals. Sometime between 1936 and 1940, Thornton handed over the headmaster's role to F.J. (John) Matthews M.A. who remained headmaster of the school until its closure in 1967.

In June 1940, just before the first German bombing raids over the town, Matthews evacuated the school to a safer location in the village of Brent Knoll in Somerset – the move almost certainly being prompted by fear of German invasion of the South Coast of England following the fall of France. What had been the school building in Gaudick Road, Eastbourne, was subsequently damaged on 16 August 1940 when a German pilot was killed falling onto its roof after his parachute failed to open.

The school's new location was at Somerset Court in Brent Knoll, which was locally (but fallaciously) remembered as one of Judge Jeffreys' court-houses in the aftermath of the 1685 Monmouth Rebellion. Somerset Court was built in the late 18th century and is now a Grade II listed building. There Matthews had the assistance of a small staff of seasoned, if untrained, teachers most of whom had experienced active service during the war, including: (Major) George (Rory, O'Brien) Newbery who first joined the school in 1929; James Serjeant (believed to have been ex-RAF); and William 'Bill' Mayo (ex Royal Navy). Mrs Barbara Solomon, a war widow, was given charge of the junior form and ran music lessons. Matthews's wife, Gerry, was in charge of catering and other domestic arrangements. Maintenance 'handy man' George Blaber and Ms Ravenscroft, the school matron, made up the remaining permanent staff.

Matthews also took on teaching duties, focussing on French and Scripture. He also led prayers at school assembly each morning during which a reading from the Bible was given by a prefect. On Sundays the boarders would walk under supervision to the local village church of St Michael for the Matins service.

As at other schools of its type, sport was strongly encouraged, with emphasis on cricket in the summer term, soccer in the autumn term and hockey in the spring. Rugby was also taught to prepare boys for public school sports. Swimming lessons were provided once per week at the Knightstone Baths in Weston-super-Mare, where a swimming competition was held once per year. Likewise, a sports day involving various forms of athletics was held once per year in the summer, followed by formal speeches and prize-giving.

A keen gardener and craftsman, Matthews personally oversaw the upkeep of the school's grounds and extensive kitchen gardens. He also imparted his carpentry and gardening skills to boys who signed up for his after-school classes, and set up a rifle range for pupils to use as an extracurricular activity.

The school closed in December 1966 on the retirement of Matthews, brought about by a combination of circumstances that included the encroachment of the (then new) M5 motorway over part of the school's sports field. However, rising costs, increasing government regulation and falling attendance were the most probable factors in the decision to close the school.

In 1974, Somerset Court was occupied by the National Autistic Society, becoming one of its main facilities for the care of autistic adults.

The buildings and grounds of Somerset Court remain much as they did in the 1950s apart from the addition of a number of extensions, workshops and residential buildings. As noted above, the construction of the M5 motorway cut off the northwest corner of the old school's sports field.
