= Meads =

Suburb of Eastbourne, East Sussex, England

Coordinates: 50.756°N 0.268°E

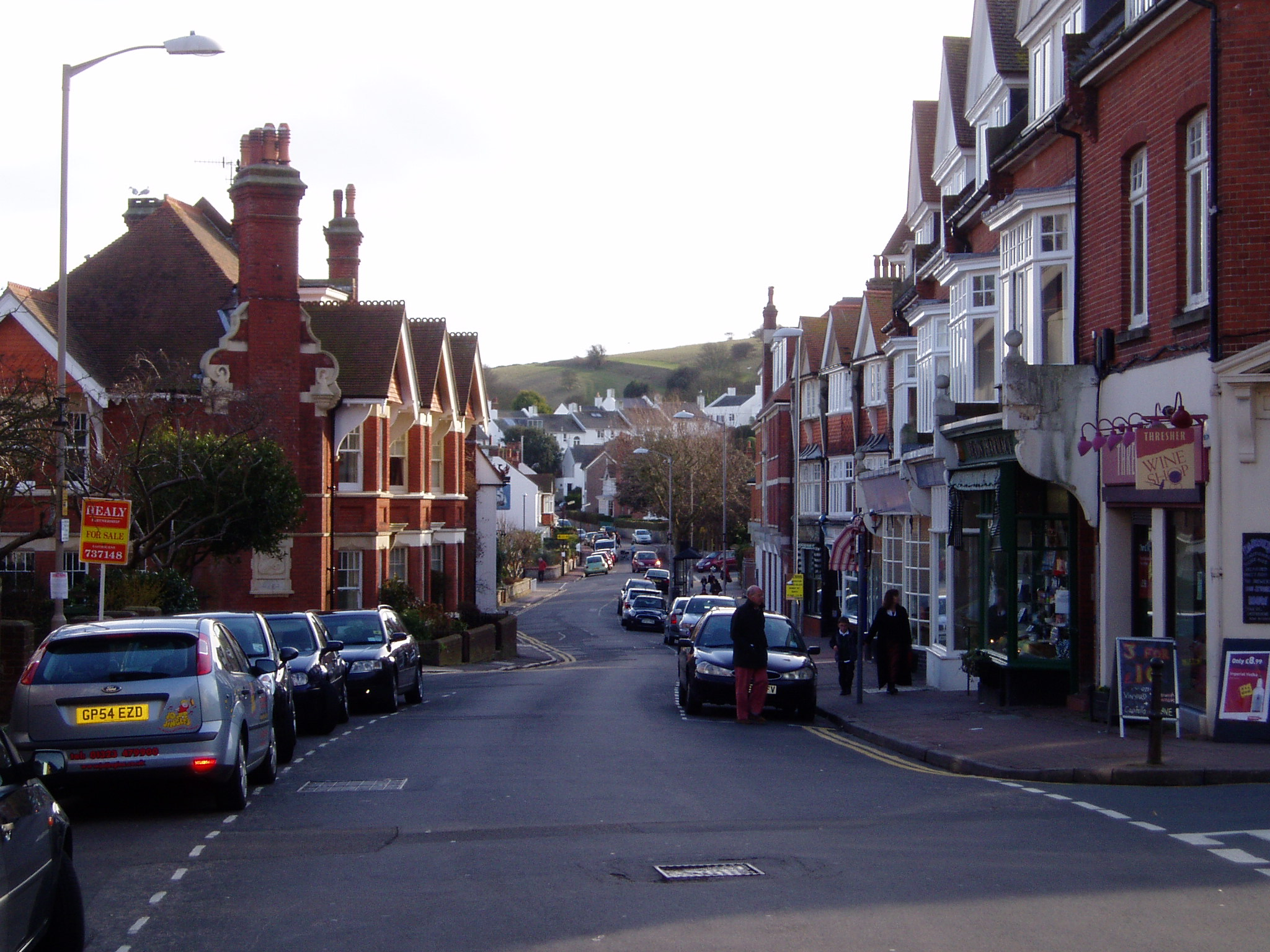
- View of Meads Street looking north to south from the junction with Matlock Road.

- Location within East Sussex
- Area: 12.5 km^{2} (4.8 sq mi)
- Population: 10,939 (2021)
  - Density: 2,253/sq mi (870/km^{2})
- OS grid reference: TV590972
  - London: 54 miles (87 km) NNW
- District: Eastbourne Borough
- Shire county: East Sussex
- Region: South East
- Country: England
- Sovereign state: United Kingdom
- Post town: EASTBOURNE
- Postcode district: BN20
- Dialling code: 01323
- Police: Sussex
- Fire: East Sussex
- Ambulance: South East Coast
- UK Parliament: Eastbourne
- Website: eastbournemeads.co.uk

Meads is an area of the town of Eastbourne in the English county of East Sussex. It is at the westerly end of the town below the South Downs.

== Boundaries ==
The local government ward of Meads is extensive, stretching from Birling Gap in the west to almost the pier in the east; it encompasses the famous cliffs of Beachy Head and the former fishing hamlet of Holywell.

In recent years, the unofficial terms 'Upper Meads' and 'Lower Meads' have been coined to differentiate between that section of the ward on higher ground to the west, and the lower part nearer to the town centre. Although there are no official boundaries, it can be said that 'Upper Meads' (the part originally known to locals as Meads) lies approximately within the bounds of the Meads Conservation Area.

=== Councillors ===
The ward is currently represented on Eastbourne Borough Council by three councillors – two Conservative, one Liberal Democrat. A further Liberal Democrat councillor represents the Meads division on East Sussex County Council.

== History ==
A 1783 map of Eastbourne shows but a couple of farms in what was then the hamlet of Meads. However, it is known that there were three in the 19th century: Place Farm, whose farmhouse survives as the listed building now known as Meads Place in Gaudick Road, Colstocks Farm, which stood on the site of St Andrew’s School and Sprays Farm, which was at the corner of Meads Street and Matlock Road. In 1859, Henry Currey, the agent of the 7th Duke of Devonshire, drew up plans for large residences with gardens of commensurate proportions. In 1871, the population of the town having trebled to 11,000, the Eastbourne Chronicle describes Meads as ‘the unrivalled Belgravia of a salubrious and flourishing health resort'. The spiritual needs of the inhabitants were catered for with the consecration of the parish church dedicated to St John the Evangelist in 1869.

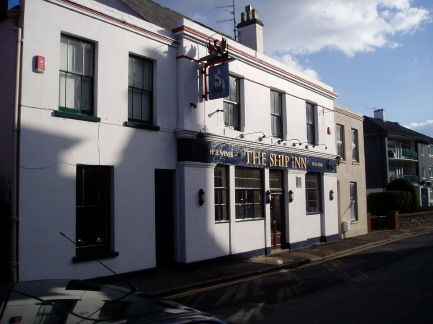
The Ship Inn is a pub in Meads Street. The site of the first Ship Inn, built in about 1600, lies firther up the road marked by a plaque.

By 1890, imposing houses in neat tree-lined roads stood on what had been grazing land and cornfields – Meads had become the smart end of town. Its residents were the well to do, and included professionals, self-made men, retired officers and former members of the Colonial Civil Service.

The absence today of street directories, makes it hard to determine the social standing of householders but even the 1940 street directory of Eastbourne (prepared in 1939) lists Lady Foley, Sir John Alexander Hammerton and Admiral Sir Robert John Prendergast KCB all living within 100 metres of each other at the top of Meads hill.

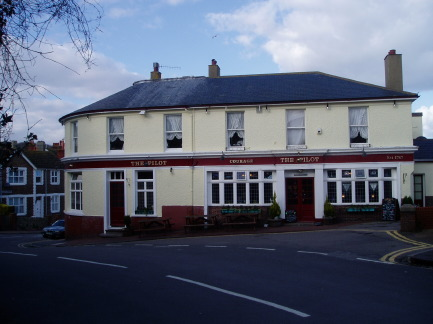
The Pilot – one of the two pubs in Meads Street. The stained glass windows depict aircraft and ships, thus evoking both meanings of the term ‘pilot’.

Many domestic servants lived in; others made their way to work from other parts of the town, or occupied cottages clustered around the three pubs – the Pilot, the Ship and the Blacksmith’s Arms, the latter demolished before the turn of the century.

In 1894, a small square of cottages was built for working class occupation. Originally known as Wallis’s Cottages, the square was subsequently named The Village.

Coachmen and grooms, followed in due course by chauffeurs, lived above the stables of De Walden Mews, the property of Lady Howard de Walden. Her mansion, De Walden Court (1884), in Meads Road is now a listed building. The inhabitants of Meads were traditionally known as ‘Meadsites’, the term remaining in current use until at least the 1950s.

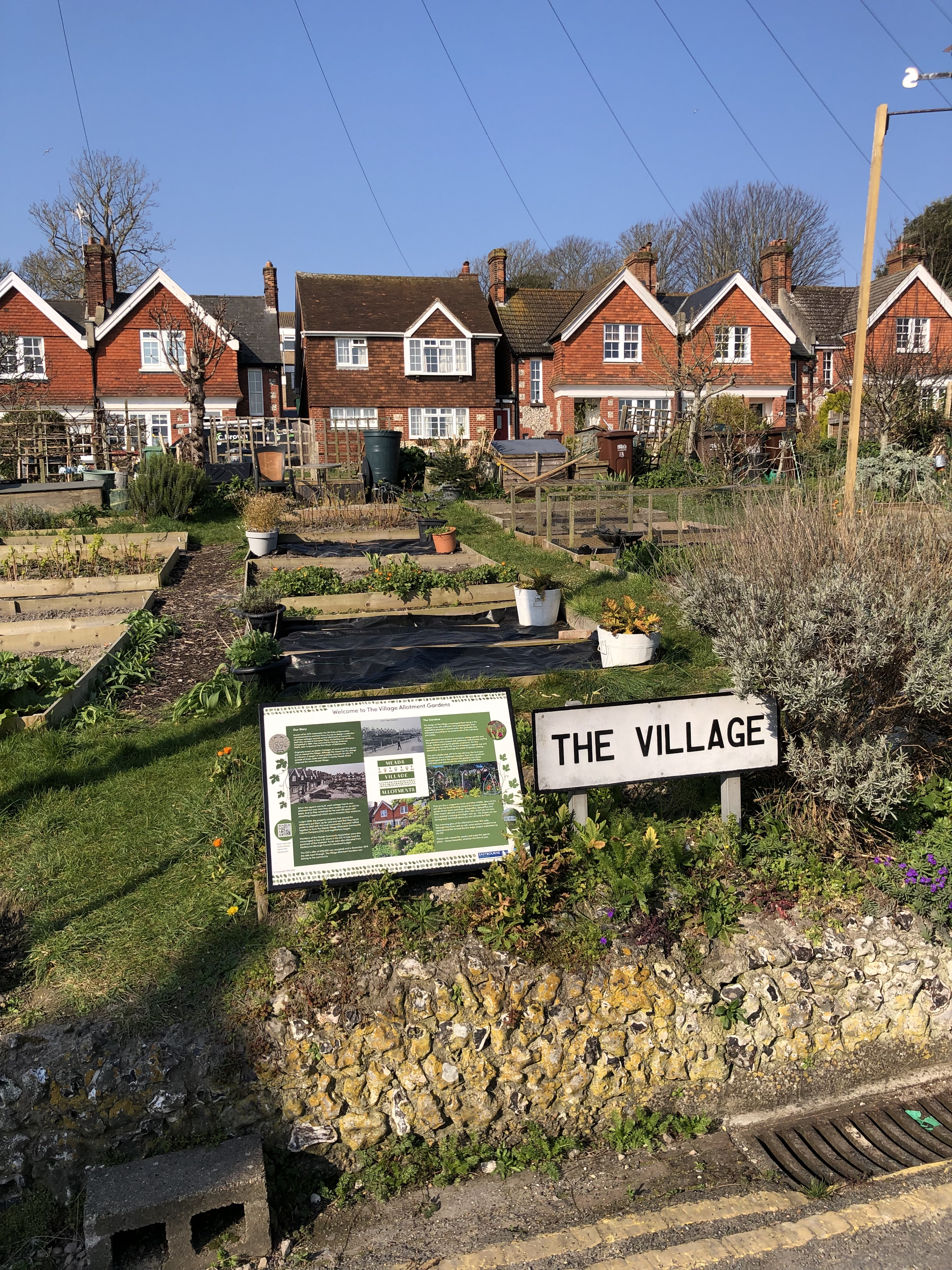
The village allotments area.

All Saints Hospital was built between 1867 and 1869 on land given by the 7th Duke of Devonshire; its chapel was added in 1874. All Saints was built as an Anglo-Catholic nunnery and convalescent home and designed by Henry Woodyer. The listed chapel in the style of High Victorian Gothic Revival is noted for polychrome effects, geometric tiling and an unusual gallery, supported on marble pillars.

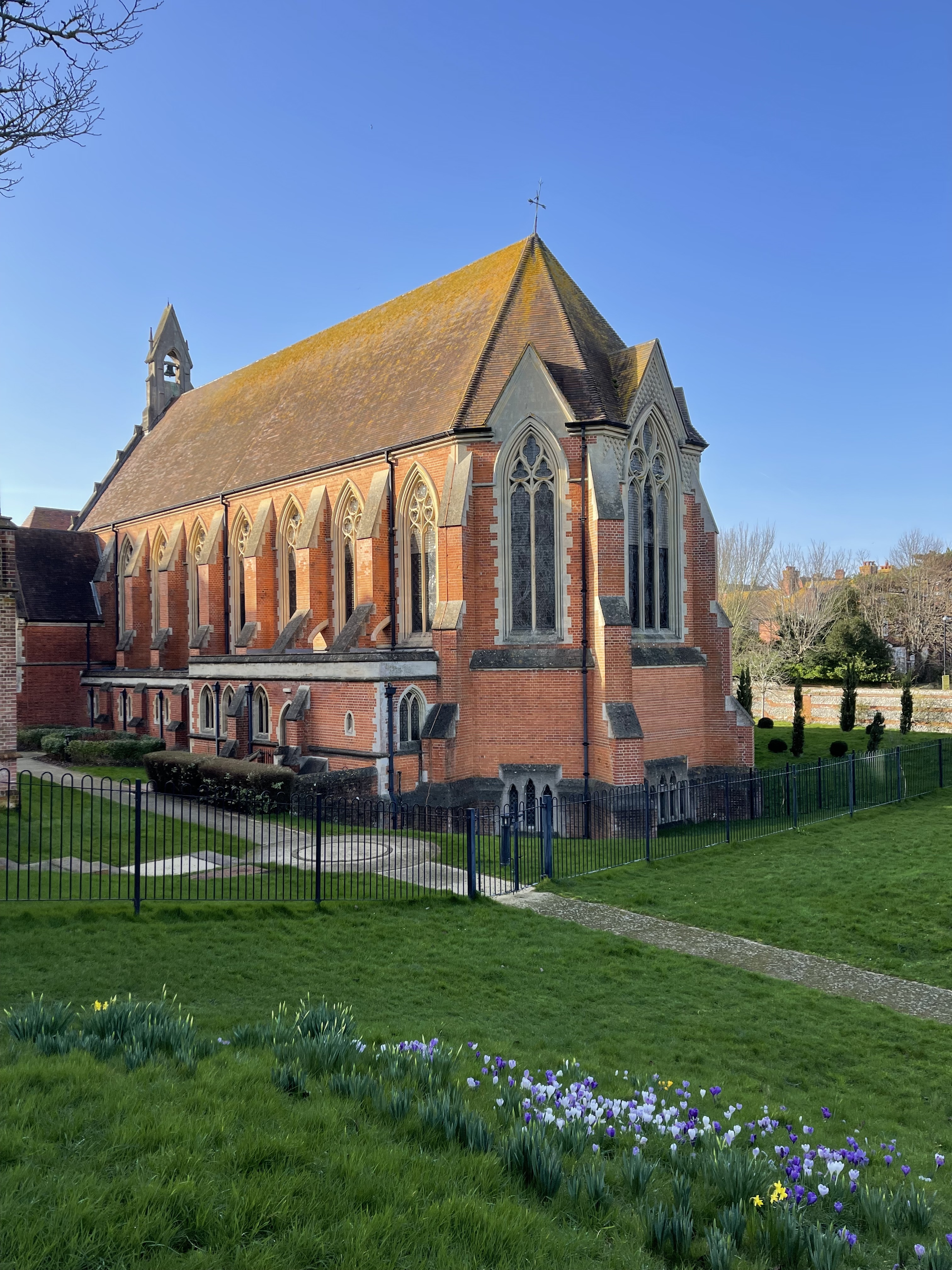
All Saints Cape.

=== The street names of Meads ===
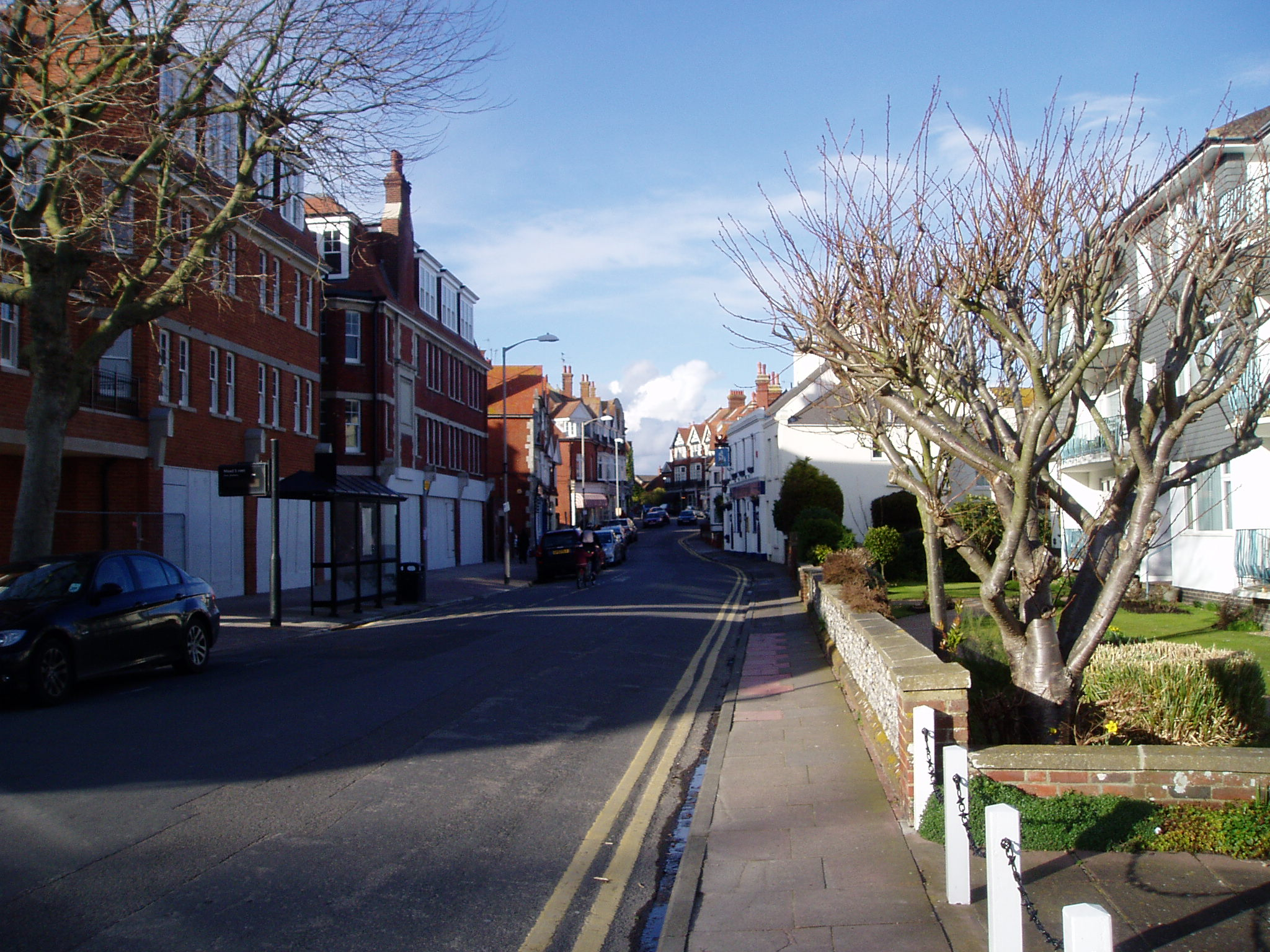
View of Meads Street looking south to north from the junction with Darley Road.

Many of the roads in Meads owe their names to towns and villages in Derbyshire around Chatsworth House, the seat of the 7th Duke of Devonshire, who developed the town in the 19th century. One obvious example is Chatsworth Gardens, the terrace of houses erected in 1891 on King Edward's Parade. Baslow Road dates from 1907 and is named after a village just north of Chatsworth House. Chesterfield Road (1888) owes its name to the important coal and iron town in Derbyshire, and Derwent Road (1895) is a reminder of the River Derwent which flows through the grounds of the Duke's residence. Others in the same category include: Bolsover (1891), Buxton, (1891), Darley (1890), Edensor (1906), Matlock (1897), Rowsley (1903) and Staveley (1890) Roads. Meads Road and Meads Street derive from the name of the original hamlet whose earlier spellings include 'Mades' (1196) and 'Medese' (1316). The hamlet developed around a manor house later known as Colstocks.

=== Meads during World War Two ===
Little of significance occurred in Meads during the period of the Phoney War, but with the fall of France in June 1940, many people departed for safety further north. Large houses were shut up as their owners left the anticipated invasion zone and schools were closed. Eastbourne College was evacuated to Radley College in Oxfordshire on 20 June.

==== Air raids ====
At about 5.30 pm on Friday 16 August 1940, the first German aircraft to be brought down within what was then the County Borough of Eastbourne crashed in Meads. A Messerschmitt Bf 110 of the Luftwaffe unit known as ZG 2 had left the former French aerodrome at Guyancourt as part of an escort for bombers raiding RAF airfields at Feltham, Heston and Heathrow. Over the South Downs, the Messerschmitt was engaged by a British fighter – almost certainly the Hurricane flown by Pilot Officer H N E Salmon of No. 1 Squadron. The German aircraft broke up in the air, and the pilot, Hauptmann Ernst Hollekamp, was killed when he fell on the roof of Hill Brow School in Gaudick Road, his parachute unopened. Part of the nose fell onto the Royal Eastbourne golf course, close to the end of Gaudick Road. The rear gunner, Feldwebel Richard Schurk, came down in the sea off Holywell and was drowned. The bulk of the aircraft crashed in the grounds of Aldro School in Darley Road — the wreckage was incorrectly identified in the local press as being that of a Heinkel He 111. At the same time, a lorry was hit in Hampden Park by a bomb which had probably been jettisoned by one of the German bombers returning from the raid on RAF airfields. Three Council workmen were killed – two instantly, the other dying the following day from burns.

On 4 May 1942, the first raid on Eastbourne by fighter-bombers took place. One of the casualties was the Meads parish church of St John, which was set ablaze and severely damaged. Until the church was rebuilt in 1957, services were held at the parish hall in Meads Street. The tower, which originally had a steeple, survived the raid but was not attached to the nave when the latter was rebuilt.

At lunchtime on Sunday 7 March 1943, a raid by Messerschmitt Bf 109 and Focke-Wulf Fw 190 aircraft caught Eastbourne unaware. In what is now known as ‘Upper Meads’, a bomb destroyed 22 - 28 Meads Street and others fell in the gardens of 3 Staveley Road and 41 St John’s Road. There were 14 civilian fatalities; 50 persons were injured. Houses used as billets by the Canadian army were damaged in Milnthorpe Road. The following evening, the German Home Service (not the broadcasts in English by Lord Haw Haw) carried interviews with two pilots who had taken part in the raid. The aircrew vividly described the effects of a bomb on a large block of buildings (“it seemed to disintegrate into a cloud of blue-black smoke”) as they were making for the town.

==== Canucks in Meads ====
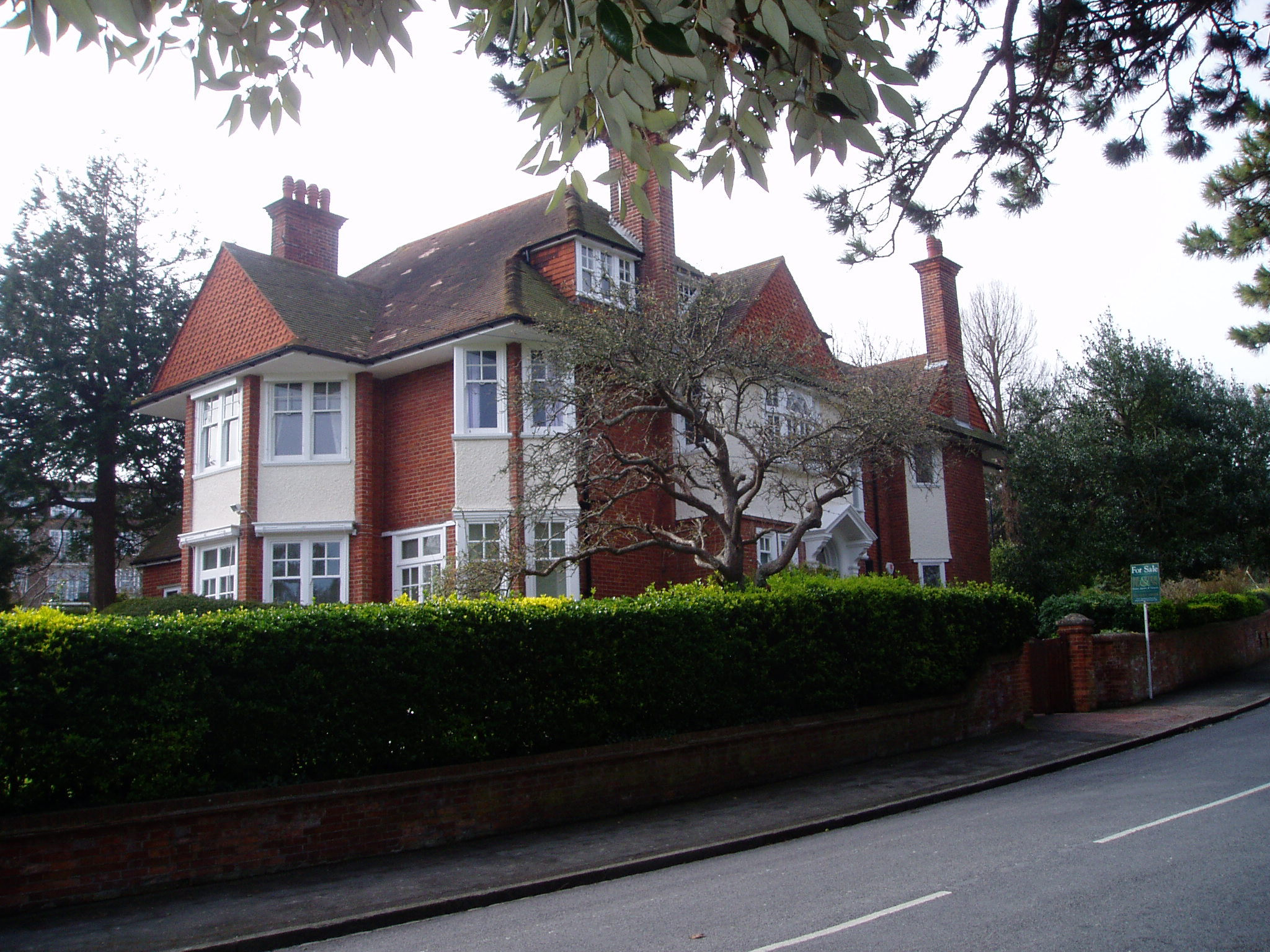
St Rita’s in Paradise Drive was the headquarters of the Black Watch of Canada for some two months from mid December 1941. An alternative battle HQ was prepared in Paradise Wood, and the Officers’ Mess was at Cloona in Carlisle Road.

The first major influx of Canadian troops to the Eastbourne area was in July 1941 with the arrival of three regiments of the 5th Canadian Infantry Brigade: The Black Watch (Royal Highland Regiment) of Canada, Le Régiment de Maisonneuve, and the Calgary Highlanders. During the course of the war, thousands of Canadians from scores of units would pass through the town.

As far as Meads was concerned, The Black Watch arrived from Willingdon on 18 December 1941. It was, however, a brief stay for they returned to Willingdon in February 1942. Canadian light anti-aircraft units were based in Meads at various times, setting up fixed and mobile gun positions on the Downs and seafront. August 1943 saw the arrival of The 23rd Field Regiment, RCA of the Royal Canadian Artillery with their Sexton self-propelled guns. There were three gun batteries: the 31st was centred on Milnthorpe Road, the 36th and 83rd were around Edensor Road. The HQ battery was located behind the Grand Hotel. The regiment stayed in Meads until it moved to Pippingford Park in March 1944 in preparation for Operation Overlord.

The Canadians were welcomed by the locals, who invited them into their homes and organised entertainment. By the same token, the troops left with happy memories. Approximately 150 Eastbourne girls sailed to Canada as war brides, some of them from Meads.

== Conservation and change ==
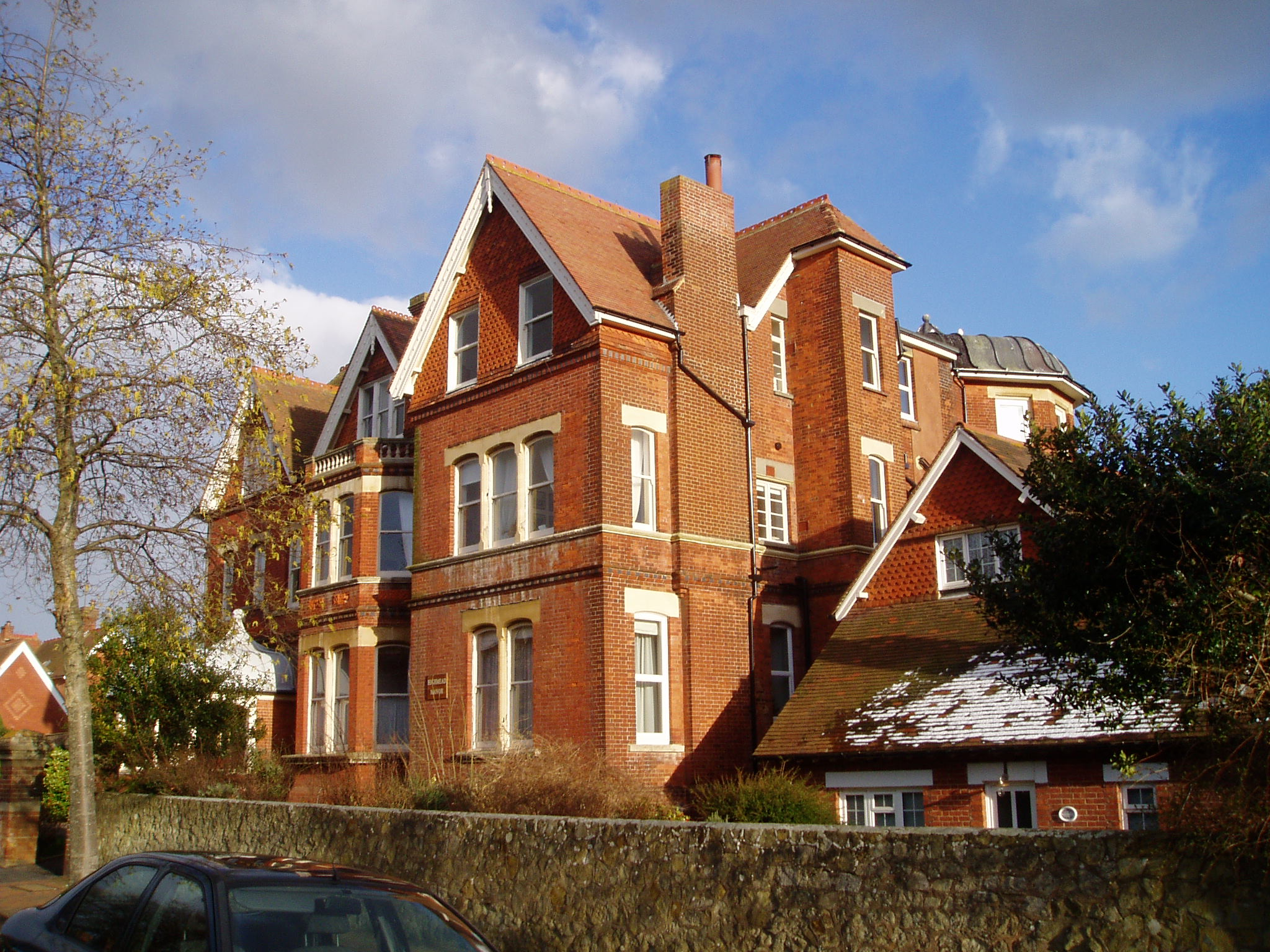
Highmead in Buxton Road – typical of the large houses in Meads built in Victorian and Edwardian times for wealthy families. It has since been converted into flats.

Meads Street still has its shops, but there have been considerable changes to the trades in recent years. The sub-post office has returned to the premises it formerly occupied in the 1950s when the shop was a traditional grocer's — today it is a self-service store. For comparison, the 1940 street directory lists 21 types of business premises in Meads Street: a baker, three banks, two boot repairers, two builders, two butchers, three garages, two grocers (one with sub-post office), a car hire firm, a chemist, a confectioner, two dairies, a fishmonger, a fruiterer, a greengrocer, a hairdresser, an ironmonger, two pubs, a stationer, a tobacconist, a wine merchant and a wool shop.

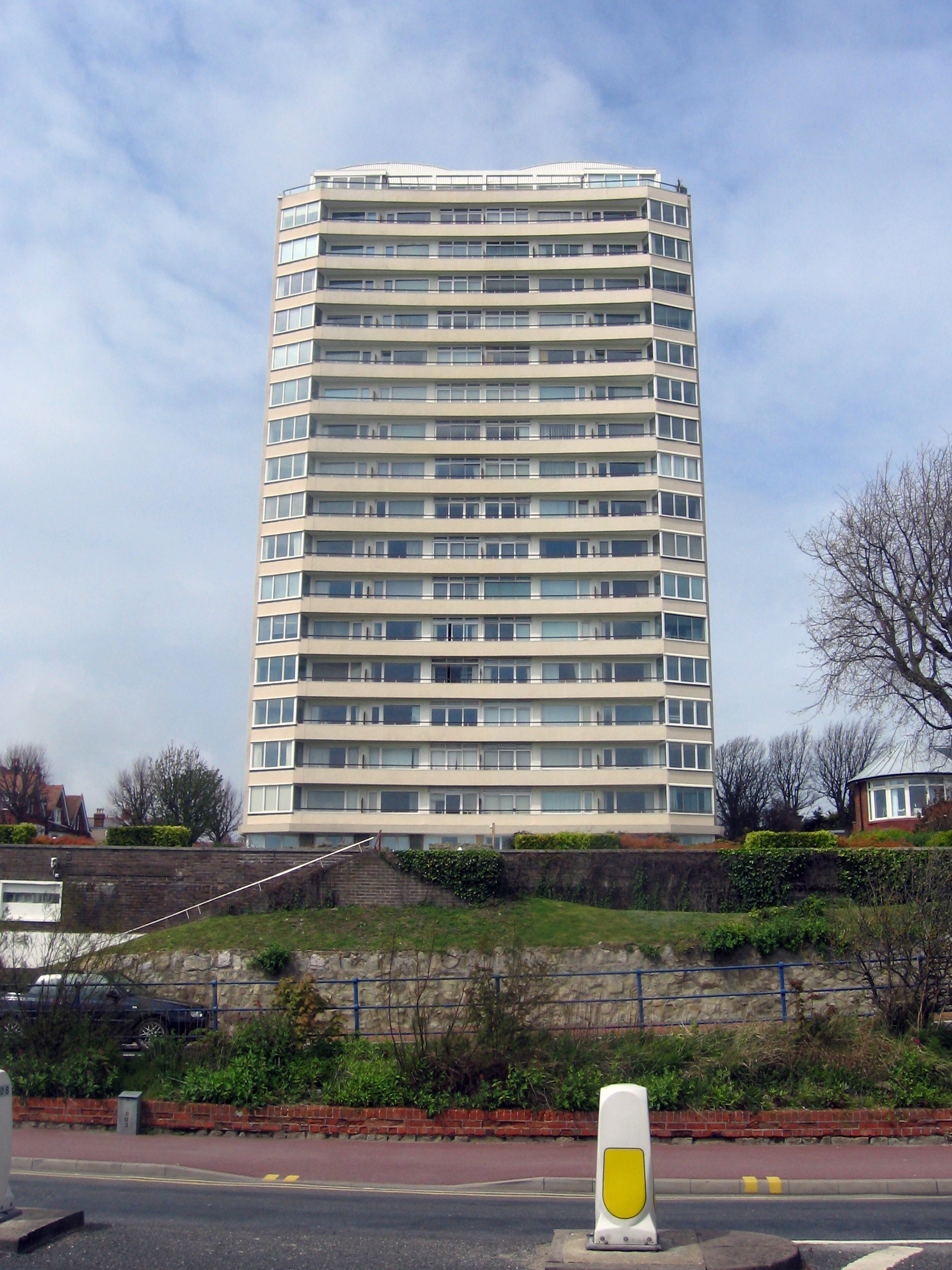
The building of the 19-storey South Cliff Tower in 1965 caused such controversy that a local protest committee was formed.

In 1965, the 19-storey South Cliff Tower was built on the seafront at the junction of Bolsover Road and South Cliff. The storm of protest which followed led to the formation of The Eastbourne and District Preservation Committee, which in due course became Eastbourne Civic Society and has subsequently been renamed The Eastbourne Society.

Despite demolitions over the years, Meads still retains many of its large Victorian and Edwardian houses, most of which have been converted into flats. A powerful lobby in the latter regard is The Meads Community Association, which was created in 1990. With some 700 members, its two principal aims are ‘to preserve the unique character of the Meads area of Eastbourne consistent with change which does not interfere with this aim’, and ‘to alert the residents of Meads to plans for development or redevelopment of property which the Committee are of the opinion should be resisted’. The association also organizes social activities to foster a community spirit and liaises with local traders.

The former All Saints Hospital, a Grade II listed building, was converted into 53 flats, with a further 52 newly built apartments within three separate buildings in the grounds. The listed chapel, however, was retained.

== Population ==
The total population of Meads ward according to the 2021 census is 10,939.

=== Demographics ===
Meads has an average age of 54.1 and the national average is 39.8, that is a difference of 14.3 years.

Population (age)	Total	0-14	15-29	30-44	45-64	65-74	74-84	85+
Eastbourne	94,816	16.0%	17.3%	18.4%	24.8%	10.2%	8.9%	4.3%
Meads	10,867	6.8%	19.4%	10.2%	21.0%	14.3%	18.5%	9.9%

The following shows the ethnic identity of residents residing in Meads from 2001 to 2021, according to census data.

Ethnicity	2001		2011		2021	
Ethnicity	Number	%	Number	%	Number	%
All usual residents	9,785	100.0	10,725	100.0	10,939	100.0
White	9,307	95.1		93.0	9,765	89.3
White British	-	-			8,425	77.0
Asian	249	2.54		3.8	420	3.8
Black	50	0.51		0.8	163	1.5
Mixed or Multiple	93	0.95		1.7	353	3.2
Other	86	0.88		0.6	238	2.2

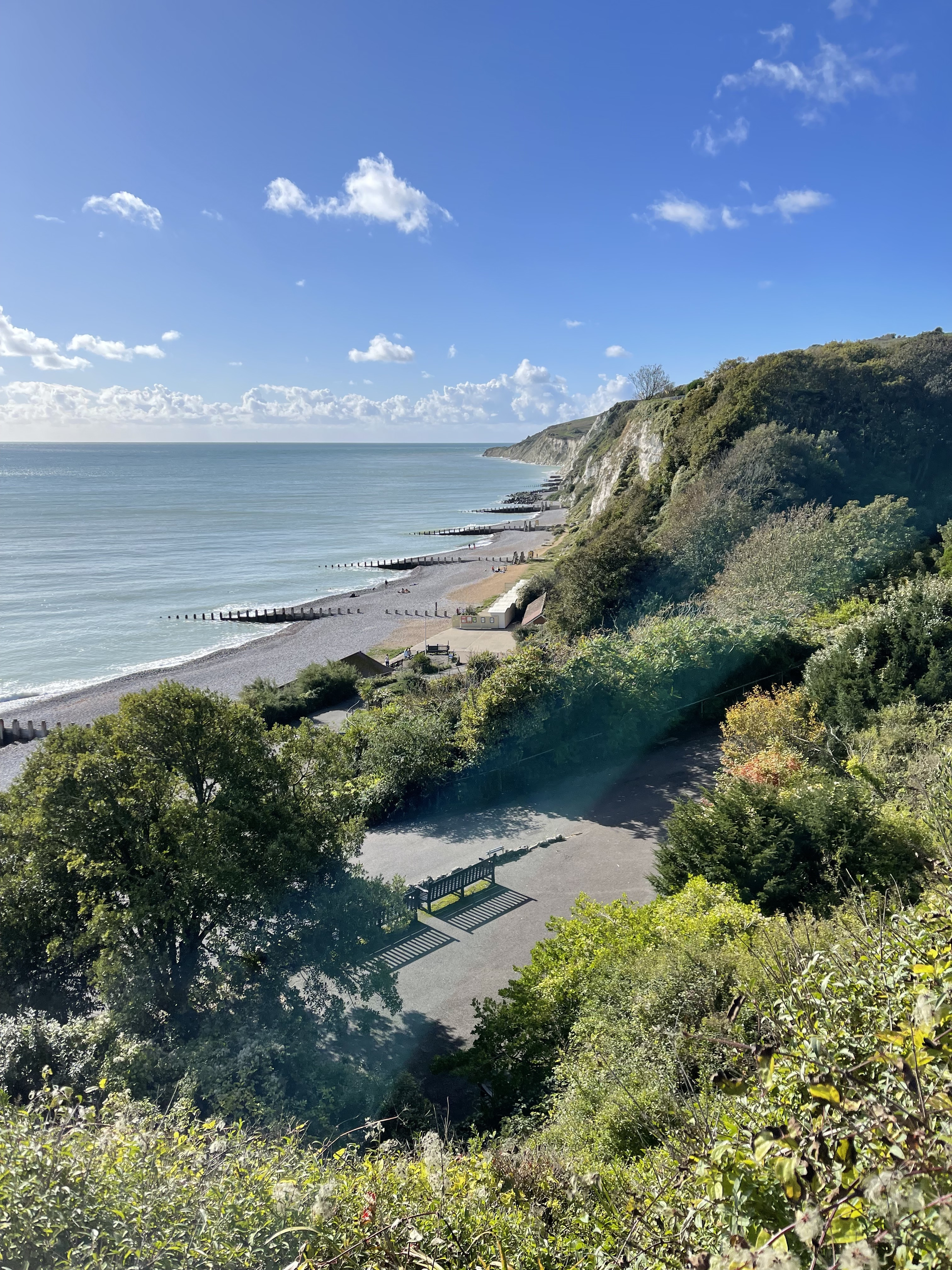
Eastbourne, Meads end of upper promenade, view over Holywell towards Beachy Head.

Year	2001	2011
Eastbourne	20.3%	22.5%
Meads	7.8%	8.6%

== Educational establishments ==
=== Higher & Further Education ===
In 1947, a teacher training college opened in Meads, the first students being troops who had recently returned to civilian life. The college was centred on Darley Road at two schools which had evacuated because of the war — Queenwood Ladies' College and Aldro. Also in 1947, Chelsea College of Physical Education moved from London, establishing itself at the former Hill Brow School in Denton Road. In 1966, a new building was opened on the site by the Queen. The buildings and grounds of both the above colleges formed part of the Eastbourne campus (in Meads — Darley Road Site, Hillbrow and Welkin Site) of the University of Brighton. The university pulled out of Meads in 2025, and the sites are now the subject of development plans.

=== Schools ===
==== Private sector ====
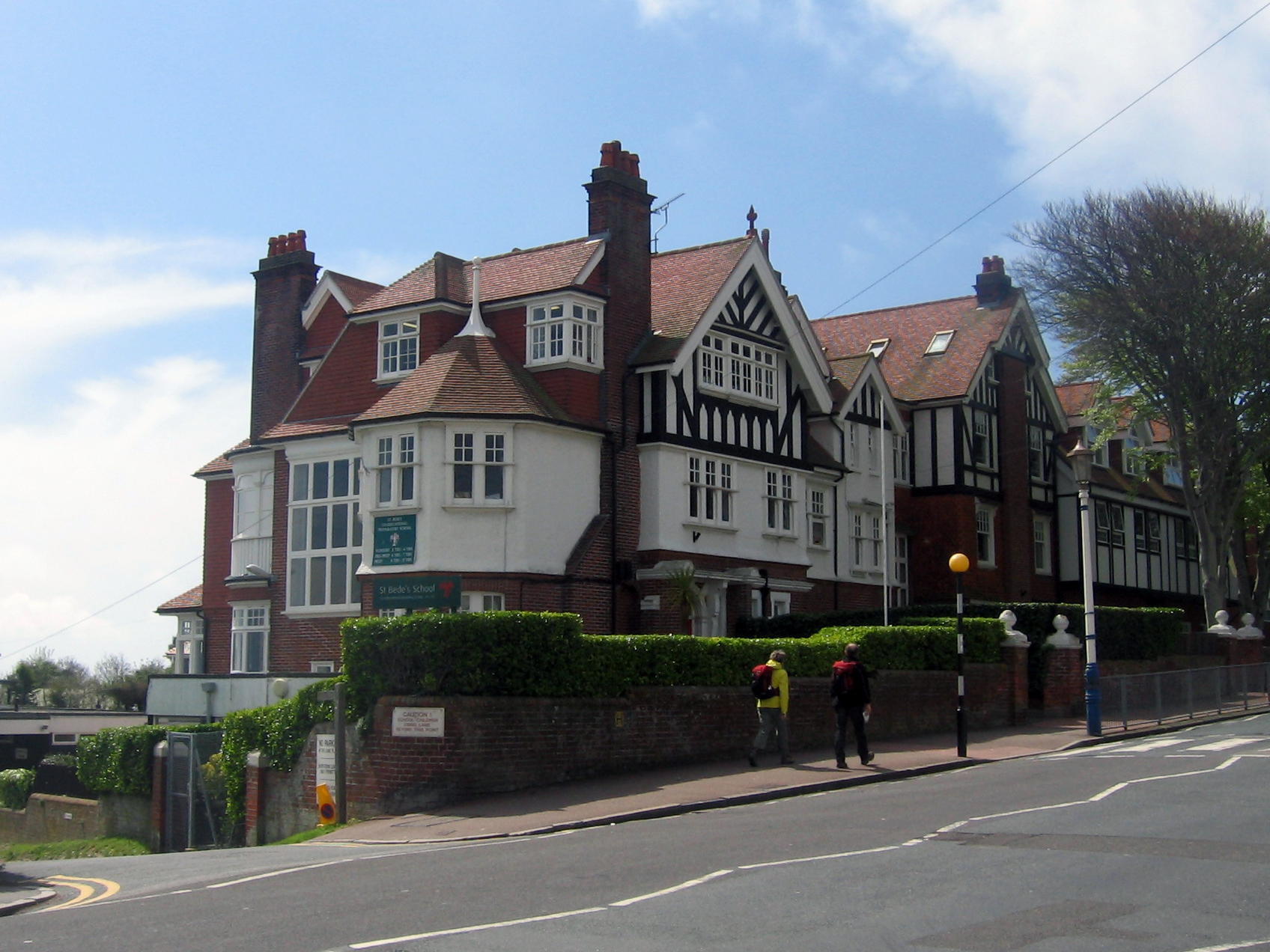
St Bede’s Preparatory School - one of the two remaining independent schools in 'Upper Meads'.

In Victorian times, Meads became a favoured area for private boarding schools — a tradition which persisted until economic factors brought about their gradual demise. Examples of the latter include Clovelly-Kepplestone girls' school which closed in Meads in 1934 and St. Christopher's Girls School which closed the same year.

Pike's Eastbourne Directory of 1911-12 shows five 'Ladies' Schools in Bolsover Road, together with Hill Brow boys' school which subsequently took over the premises of St. Christopher's girls school in Denton Road when that school closed in 1934.

A street directory for 1940 (prepared in 1939) lists ten private schools in 'Upper Meads' alone. However, the war signalled the final phase for private schools, and only eight of those which evacuated from the town returned to Eastbourne. One of the post-war returners was Ascham St Vincent's School, a preparatory school for boys in Meads which subsequently closed in 1977. The site was sold for property development and a merger with St. Andrew's took place. The 'Ascham Memorial Arch' in Carlisle Road commemorates former pupils who lost their lives in the First World War.

Two independent schools now remain in 'Upper Meads' - St Andrew's Prep and St Bede's Preparatory School (now called Bede's Prep School). The public school, Eastbourne College is in 'Lower Meads'.

==== State sector ====
St. John's Meads is a Church of England Aided Primary School, with approximately 215 children on its roll. Undergoing many additions and changes over the years, the school has been on its present site for over a century.
