= Bede's School =

Independent School in East Sussex, England

Bede's Prep School
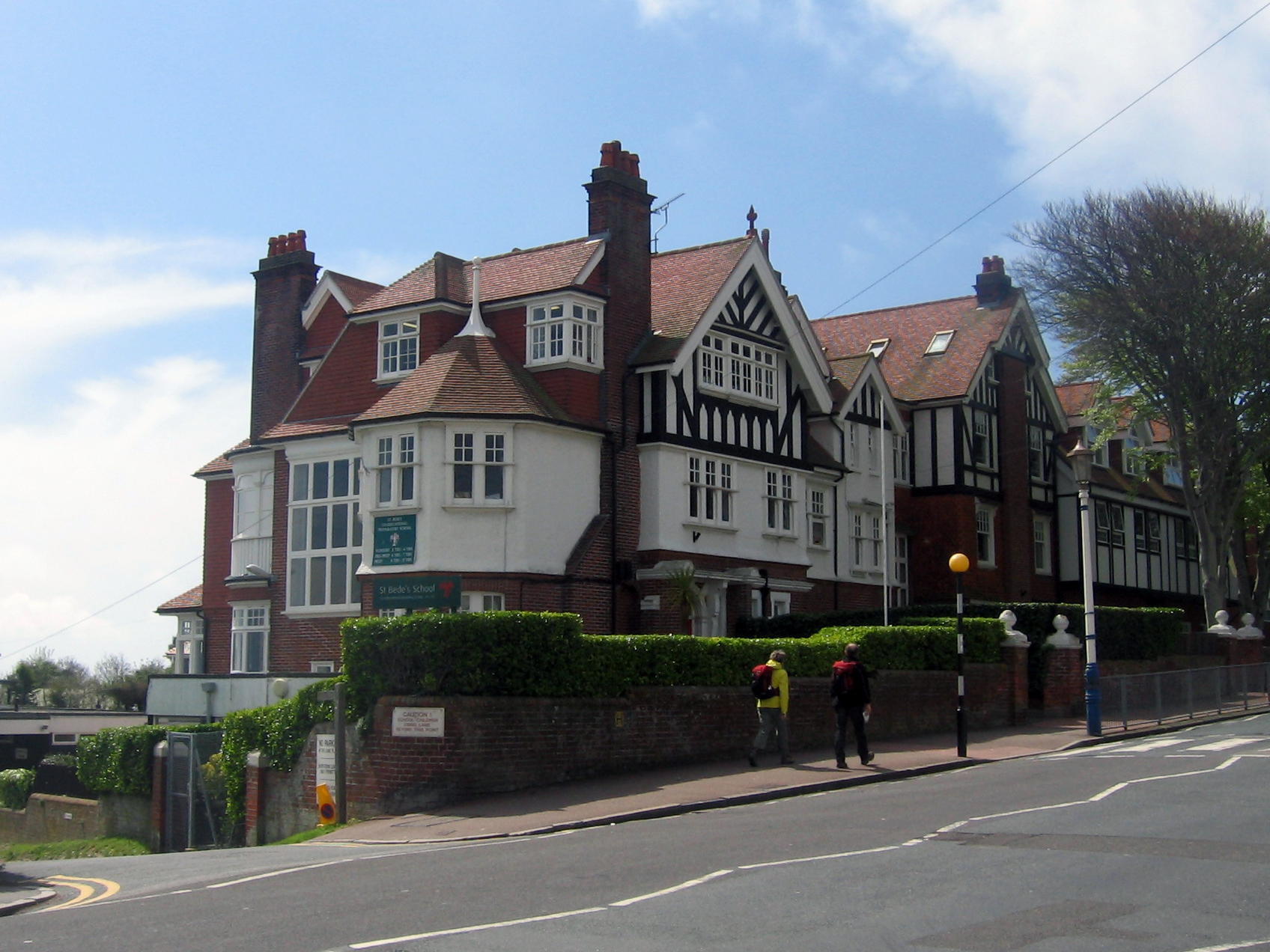

Location
- Dukes Drive; Eastbourne, East Sussex, BN20 7XL; England

Information
- Type: Coeducational; Day and boarding
- Religious affiliations: Historically Anglican/ Church of England, secular (since 2012)
- Established: 1895
- Founder: Frances Browne
- Local authority: Eastbourne
- Department for Education URN: 114653 Tables
- Chair: Geraldine Watkins
- Headteacher: Leigh-Anne Morris (2023-)
- Religious head: Jarrod Taylor
- Gender: Coeducational
- Age: 3 Months to 13 Years
- Houses: Eagle; Falcon; Hawk; Raven
- Colours: Green; Red; White
- Website: https://www.bedes.org/prep

Bede's Senior School

Location
- Camberlot Road; Upper Dicker, East Sussex, BN27 3QH; England; 50.867°N 0.203°E

Information
- Type: Private day and boarding school
- Religious affiliation: Open
- Established: 1979
- Founder: P. P. Pyemont
- Local authority: Wealden
- Department for Education URN: 114657 Tables
- Chair: Geraldine Watkins
- Headteacher: Peter Goodyer (2016-)
- Religious head: Jarrod Taylor
- Staff: 200
- Gender: Coeducational
- Age: 13 to 18
- Enrolment: 750
- Houses: Day: Male: Deis; Dicker; Knights; Female: Bloomsbury; Charleston; Boarding: Male: Camberlot; Dorms; Stud; Female: Crossways; Dorter
- Website: https://www.bedes.org/senior

Bede's School (until 2012 known as St Bede's School) consists of a preparatory school and pre-preparatory nursery in Holywell, Meads, Eastbourne, East Sussex, England, as well as a senior school based in Upper Dicker, Hailsham, East Sussex, England. These, along with the Legat School of Dance, form the Bede's School Trust, an educational charity. All three institutions are private fee-charging schools.

== History ==
The Prep School was founded in 1895 by Frances Browne, at her house in Blackwater Road, Eastbourne, as Eastbourne College Prep School. It opened with four boys and D Burdett was appointed headmaster.

In 1900 the school was acquired by G Gowring who purchased a site in Dukes Drive and, at a cost of £7,000 built what is still the school's home today.

At the time of the Second World War, St Bede's was owned by and Kenneth Harding and his wife. During the war pupils were evacuated to St Edward's, Oxford, whilst the building itself was used for the essential wartime training of about 2,000 telegraphists who specialised in enemy code and cipher. St Bede's boys moved back to Eastbourne on VE Day, 8 May 1945.

Hugh Candlin was headmaster from 1946 to 1964 following the retirement of Ken Harding in 1946.

In 1964 Peter Pyemont and his wife Elspeth took over the school and four years later it accepted its first girl pupil.

In 1971 it was formed into a charitable trust, administered by a board of governors.

In 1978 a country estate, eight miles to the north of Eastbourne, was purchased, and St Bede's Senior School opened its doors in the village of Upper Dicker to just over 30 students. The estate that was purchased, known to some as The Dicker, was the former of the Edwardian MP, financier and fraudster, Horatio Bottomley.

As of September 2012, St Bede's Senior School, Prep School and Pre-Prep and Nursery dropped the 'St.' from their titles.

== Preparatory School ==
Bede's Prep School is situated on the South Downs, next to the Helen Gardens in Eastbourne.

The Prep School was founded in 1895 with a roll of four boys. In 1902, it moved from its site in Blackwater Road to larger premises in the Meads area of Eastbourne, at Dukes Drive.

In 2009, new dining rooms, the conversion of Holywell Mount to a nursery, and new classrooms were built, and there is now a roll of around 400 pupils.

Through Bede's Pre-Prep and Nursery, the trust now educates children from infancy up to Common Entrance exams at Year 8.

Its current Head is Mrs Leigh-Anne Morris who was appointed in 2023.

The school is also famous for its John Bodkin Adams' connection, a doctor believed to have tricked patients into adding him into their will before poisoning them. The headmaster, Vaughan Tomlinson died on 14 November 1950. His widow, Gertrude, having remarried and now Gertrude Hullett, died soon after this in mysterious circumstances on 23 July 1956. Her death led to an investigation into her doctor, John Bodkin Adams. He was tried at the Old Bailey in 1957 on two counts of murder and controversially found not guilty. Home Office pathologist Francis Camps identified 163 cases where Adams' patients died in suspicious circumstances.

== Senior School ==
Bede's Senior School is a secondary, co-educational boarding school with five boarding houses and five day houses, including four girls houses and six boys houses, in the village of Upper Dicker, near Hailsham, with a total of 750 pupils and 223 staff, not including grounds or catering staff, working across the site giving a student to teacher ratio of just over three to one.

The Senior School site covers around 70 acres (280,000 m^{2}) of area and was founded in 1979 by P. Pyemont. The first appointed headmaster was R. Perrin.

The current headmaster is Peter Goodyer, who joined the school in 2016.

== Facilities ==
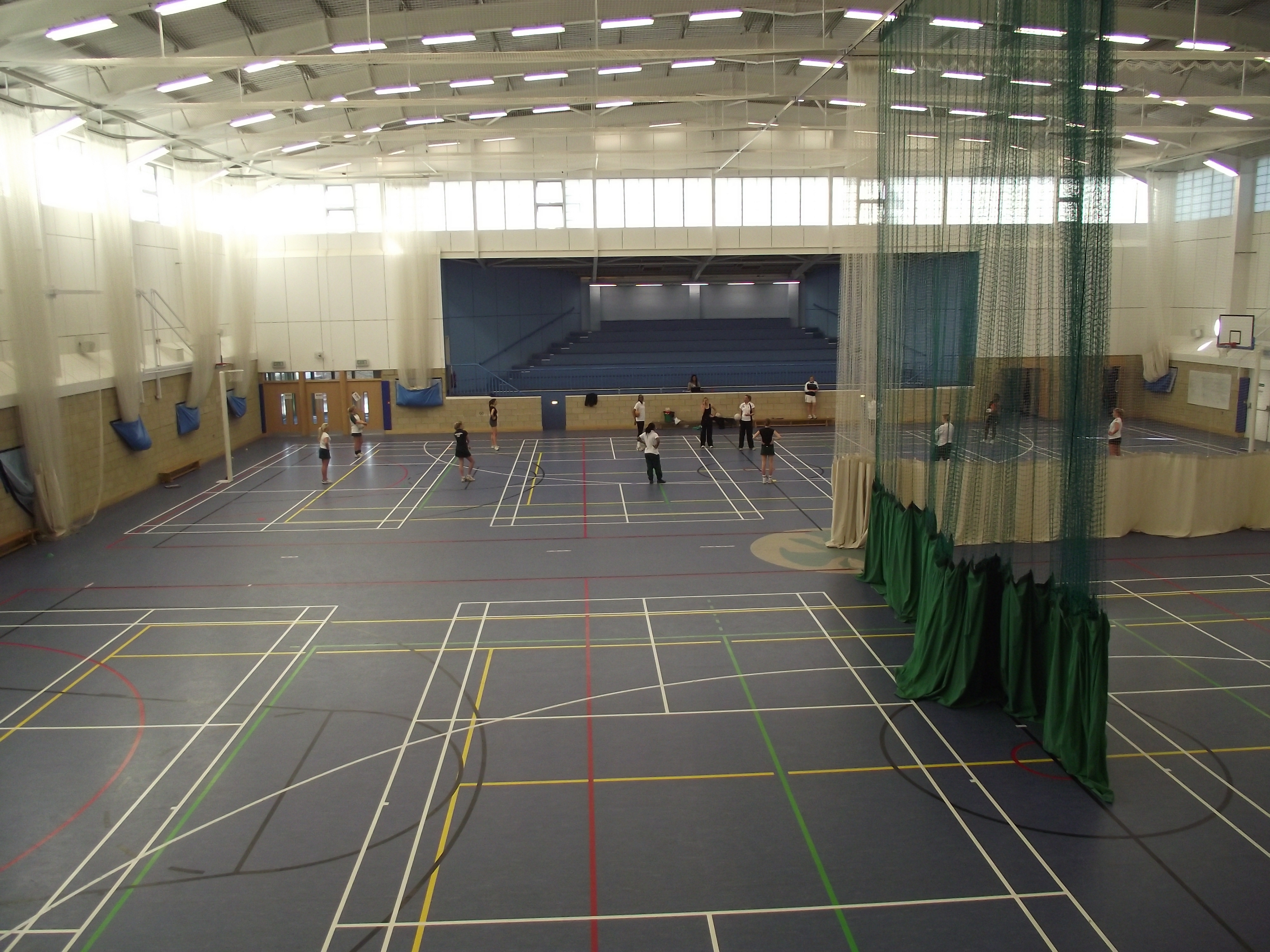
Inside the modern multi-Purpose hall at the Senior School

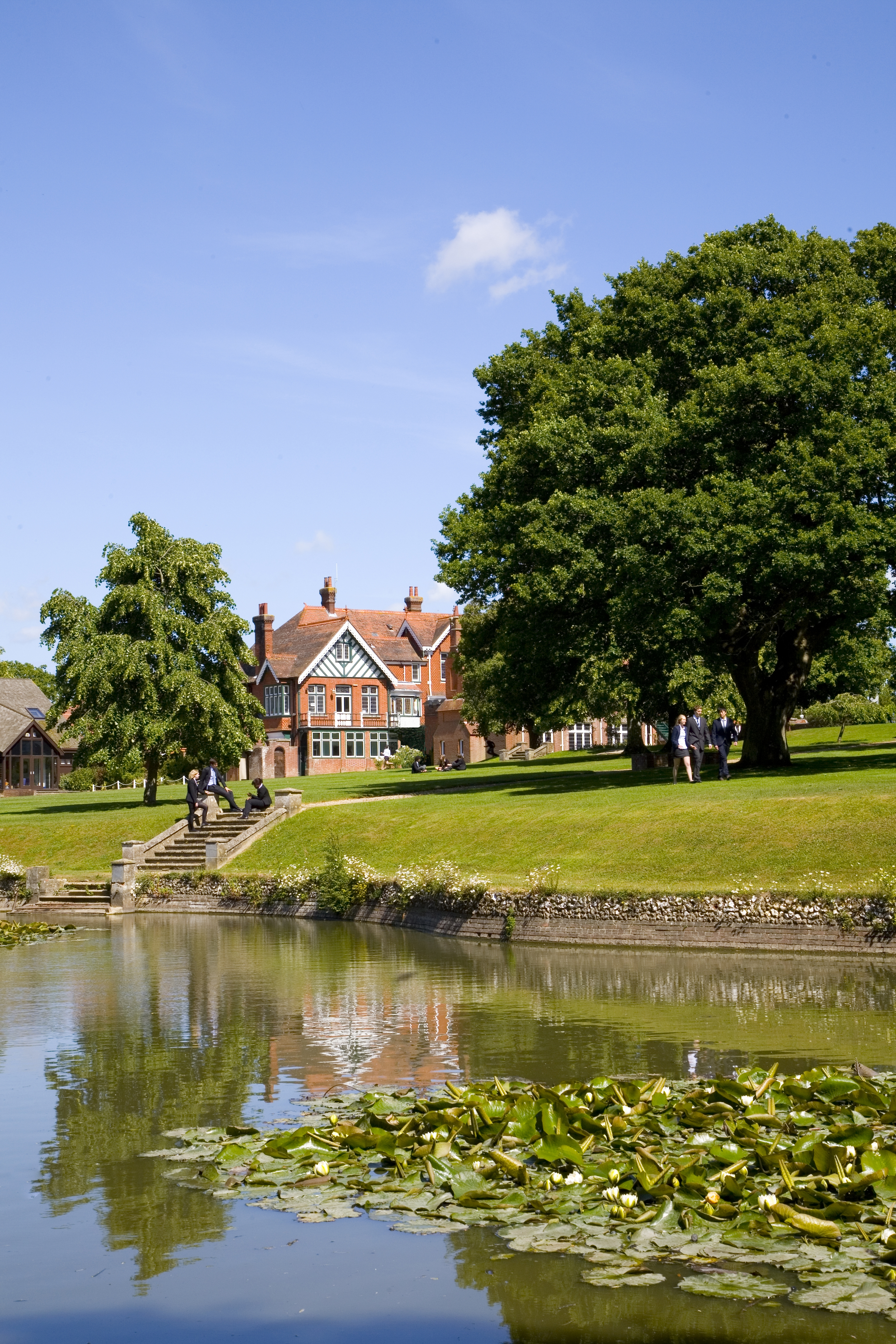
Views from the lake at the Senior School

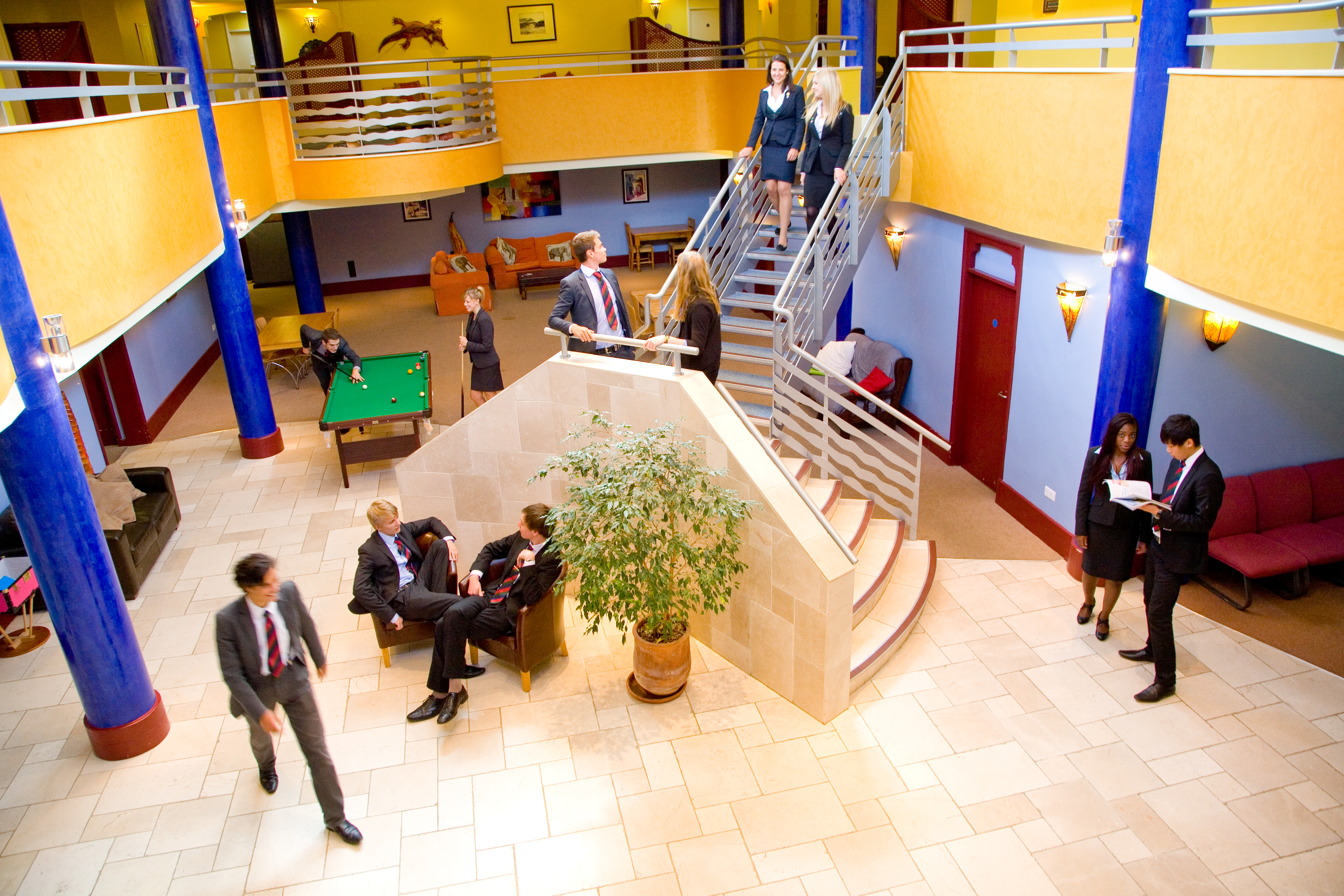
One of the Boarding Houses at the Senior School

At the Prep School, Holywell House, which was formerly used for Year 8 and senior years, has now been rebuilt into a nursery for infants. The Prep's senior years have moved into new classrooms. The Prep School has science labs which were built in 2007. The area which had been taken up by the old dining room has also been converted into cookery rooms and a bigger dance studio.

At the Senior School, new boarding houses have been built with common rooms and bedrooms that are arranged in ‘flats’ ranging from singles and doubles to ‘fours’ for the younger students. Drama performances take place in the Miles Studio, which opened in 2006 and also houses the Legat School of Dance. The Multi Purpose Hall (MPH), opened in 2007, has indoor cricket nets, netball courts and badminton courts.

Inside the MPH, the indoor swimming pool is of championship size, along with a fitness centre and four squash courts. Music performances also take place in the Multi Purpose Hall, in the school's Recital Room and often outside in the Park, with the annual 'Bede's Fest' rock and pop music festival, as well as Cabaret, a bi-annual formal dinner, taking place here.

The school has its own zoo that maintains over 60 species of animals. These range from mammals including monkeys, lemurs, a binturong and marmosets to various birds, reptiles and fish.

Elsewhere within the grounds, there is a golf course, football, rugby and cricket pitches, an all-weather Astro that is used for hockey throughout the year, tennis courts, and a cricket oval including the M-J Pavilion built in honour of alumnus and cricket commentator Christopher Martin-Jenkins.

== Former pupils ==
Alumni are known as Old Bedians.

=== St Bede's Senior School, Upper Dicker ===
- Rob Buchanan, rugby union footballer
- Alice Capsey, cricketer
- Earl Cave, actor
- Dan Harding, footballer
- Shai Hope, cricketer
- Fynn Hudson-Prentice, cricketer
- Jamie Lloyd, theatre director
- Solly March, footballer
- James Norwood, footballer
- Ollie Rayner, cricketer
- Luke Wells, cricketer

=== St Bede's Prep School, Eastbourne ===
- Nicky Henson
- Eddie Izzard
- Sirichok Sopha, politician
- Christopher Martin-Jenkins, cricket journalist
- Peter Cook
