= Brent Knoll (village) =

Village in Somerset, England

Coordinates: 51.250°N 2.954°W

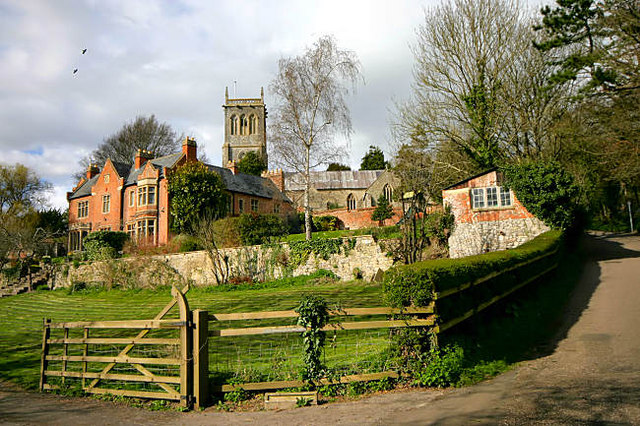
- Brent Knoll church and vicarage

- Location within Somerset
- Population: 1,255 (in 2021)
- OS grid reference: ST334505
- Civil parish: Brent Knoll
- Unitary authority: Somerset Council
- Ceremonial county: Somerset
- Region: South West
- Country: England
- Sovereign state: United Kingdom
- Post town: HIGHBRIDGE
- Postcode district: TA9
- Dialling code: 01278
- Police: Avon and Somerset
- Fire: Devon and Somerset
- Ambulance: South Western
- UK Parliament: Wells and Mendip Hills

Brent Knoll, formerly known as South Brent, is a village and civil parish in Somerset, England, which lies on the southern edge of Brent Knoll – a hill with a height of 137 metres (450 ft) that dominates the low surrounding landscape of the Somerset Levels. The parish had a population of 1,255 at the 2021 census.

== History ==
The village of Brent Knoll lies at the south west base of the hill. Between 1875 and 1883 its name was changed from South Brent to Brent Knoll to avoid rail passenger confusion with the village of South Brent in Devon.

Brent Knoll railway station, at the western extremity of the village, was built as part of the Bristol and Exeter Railway and operated from 1875 until its closure on 4 January 1971.

Somerset Court, at the eastern end of the village, was built in the late 18th century and is a Grade II listed building. From 1940 until 1968, it housed Hill Brow Preparatory School for Boys and since 1974 it has been occupied by the National Autistic Society who use it as one of its main centres for the care of autistic adults.

== Governance ==
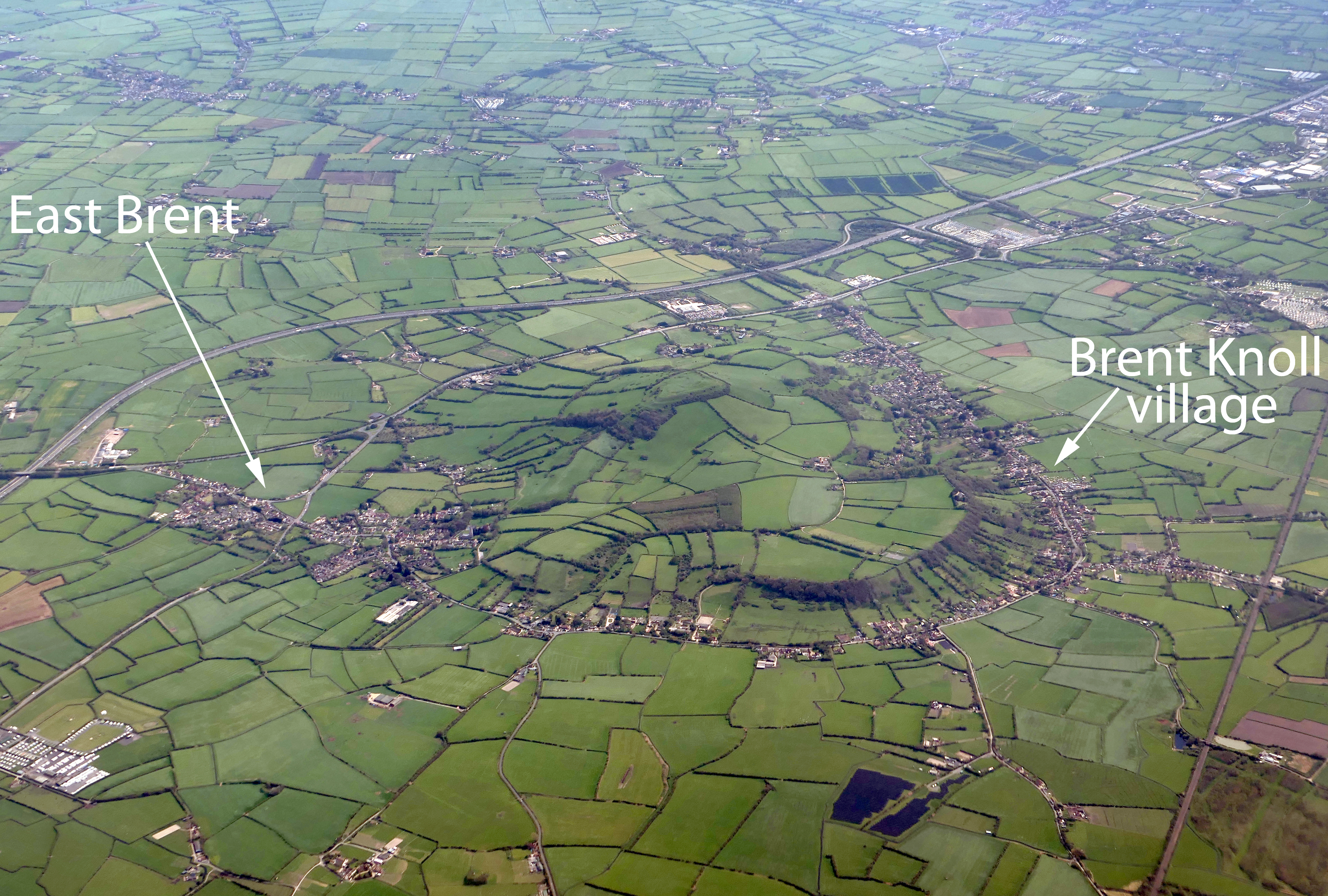
Aerial view of Brent Knoll

The parish council has responsibility for local issues, including setting an annual precept (local rate) to cover the council's operating costs and producing annual accounts for public scrutiny. The parish council evaluates local planning applications and works with the local police, district council officers, and neighbourhood watch groups on matters of crime, security, and traffic. The parish council's role also includes initiating projects for the maintenance and repair of parish facilities, as well as consulting with the district council on the maintenance, repair, and improvement of highways, drainage, footpaths, public transport, and street cleaning. Conservation matters (including trees and listed buildings) and environmental issues are also the responsibility of the council.

For local government purposes, since 1 April 2023, the village comes under the unitary authority of Somerset Council. Prior to this, it was part of the non-metropolitan district of Sedgemoor, which was formed on 1 April 1974 under the Local Government Act 1972, having previously been part of Axbridge Rural District.

The village is in 'Knoll' electoral ward. Although Brent Knoll is the most populous area the ward stretches south to East Huntspill and north to Lympsham. The total population of the ward taken from the 2011 census was 5,016.

It is also part of the Wells and Mendip Hills constituency represented in the House of Commons of the Parliament of the United Kingdom. It elects one Member of Parliament (MP) by the first past the post system of election, and was part of the South West England constituency of the European Parliament prior to Britain leaving the European Union in January 2020, which elected seven MEPs using the d'Hondt method of party-list proportional representation.

== Religious sites ==
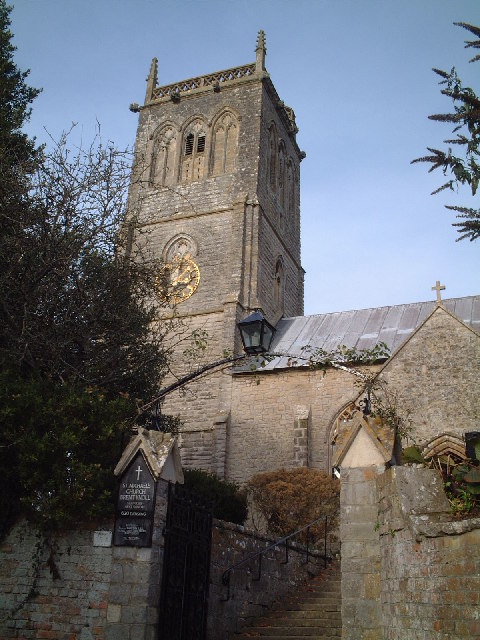
Church of St Michael

The Church of St Michael dates back to the 11th century but has undergone several renovations since. The tower contains a bell dating from 1777 and made by William Bilbie of the Bilbie family. Within the church are three notable bench ends depicting anti-clerical legends of the Fox. It has been designated by English Heritage as a grade I listed building.

== See also ==
- Brent Knoll Camp, an Iron Age hill fort on the top of the hill next to the village
