= Holywell, Eastbourne =

Area of Eastbourne, East Sussex, England

Coordinates: 50°45′13″N 0°16′22″E

Holywell
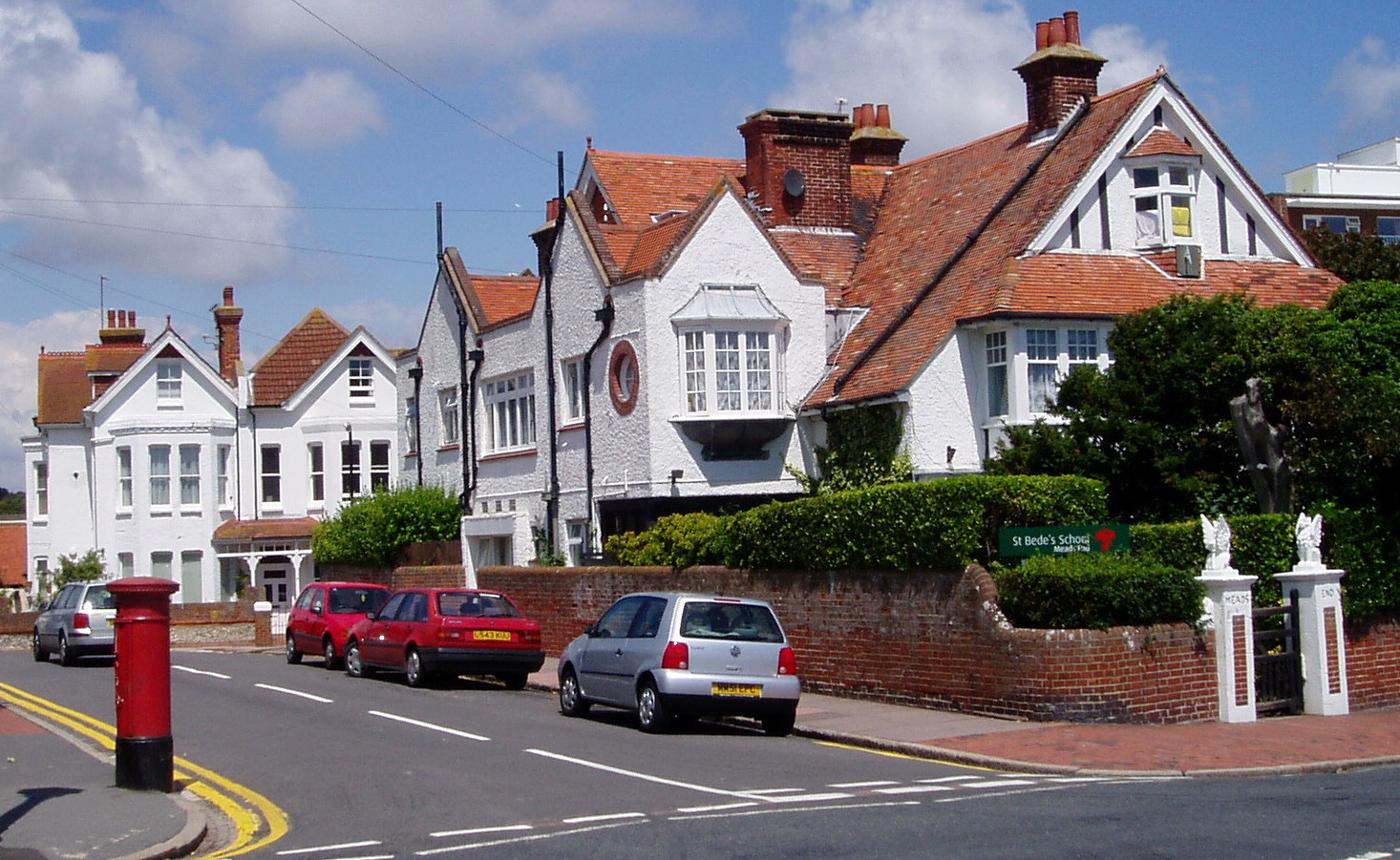
- Holywell Road, looking towards Meads Street. The ancient lane leading to Holywell and the sea continues in the opposite direction

- Location within East Sussex
- District: Eastbourne
- Shire county: East Sussex
- Region: South East
- Country: England
- Sovereign state: United Kingdom

Holywell (traditional local pronunciation "holy well") is a part of Meads, a district of Eastbourne in the county of East Sussex, UK. Holywell has no specific boundaries, but lies approximately between the western end of the lower promenade and the chalk pinnacle below Bede's Preparatory School.

== History ==
William Figg’s 1816 map of Eastbourne shows an area called Holly Well Furlong near what was until 1896 the Hollywell fishing hamlet. This settlement was by the low cliff edge, above the place where fresh water emerges from the chalk. Below the chalk at this point lies an impervious stratum of gault which causes the rainwater which has seeped through the chalk to spill out almost at sea level. The fishing settlement was approached from what is now Holywell Road via the lane between the present Helen Gardens and St Bede's Preparatory School. On the left side of this lane, opposite the present sports complex of St Bede's School, stood Holywell House - said to have been an inn at one time. The house was standing as early as 1839 and demolished in about 1897.

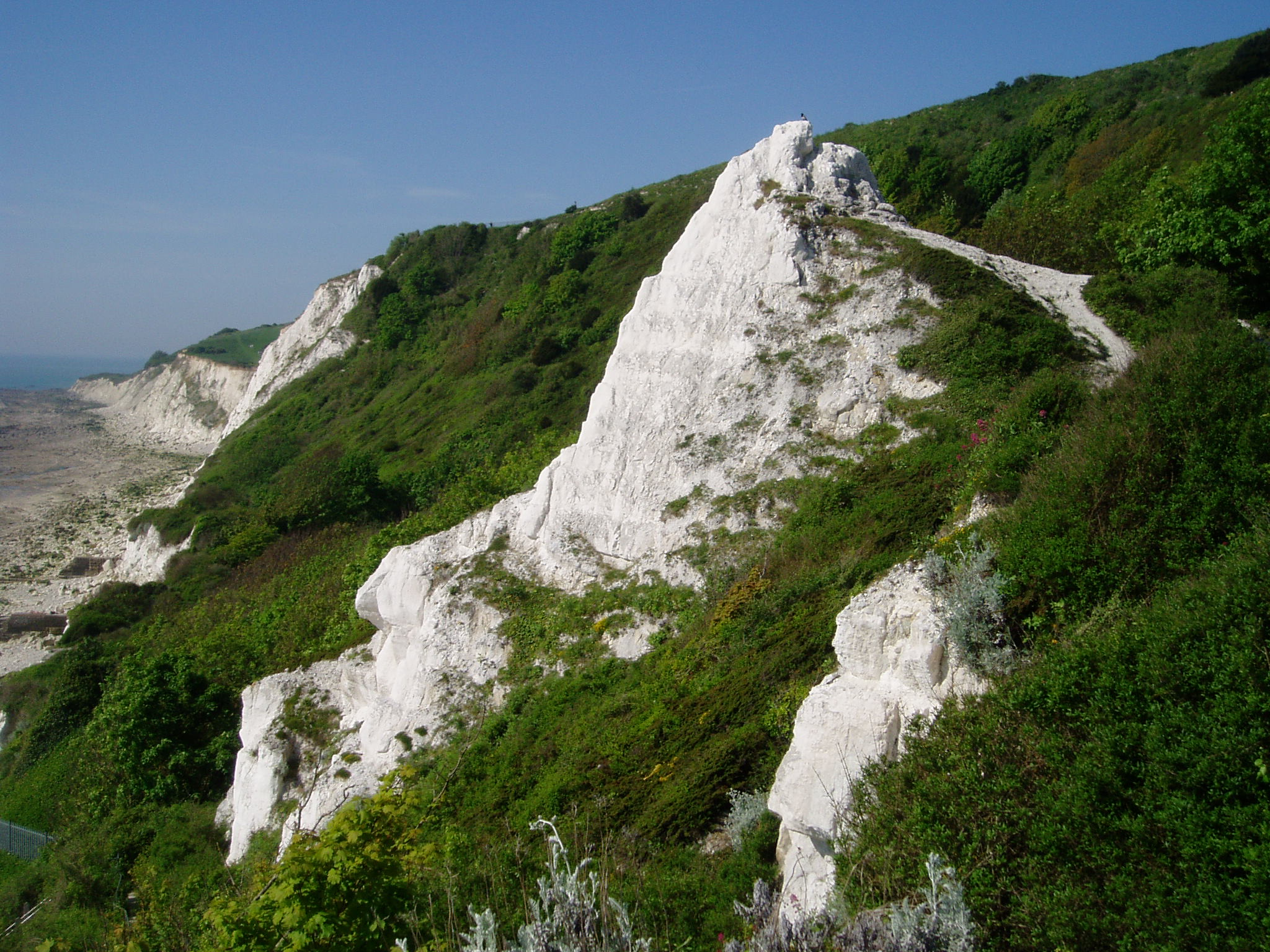
The Pinnacle (formerly known as Gibraltar) above Holywell

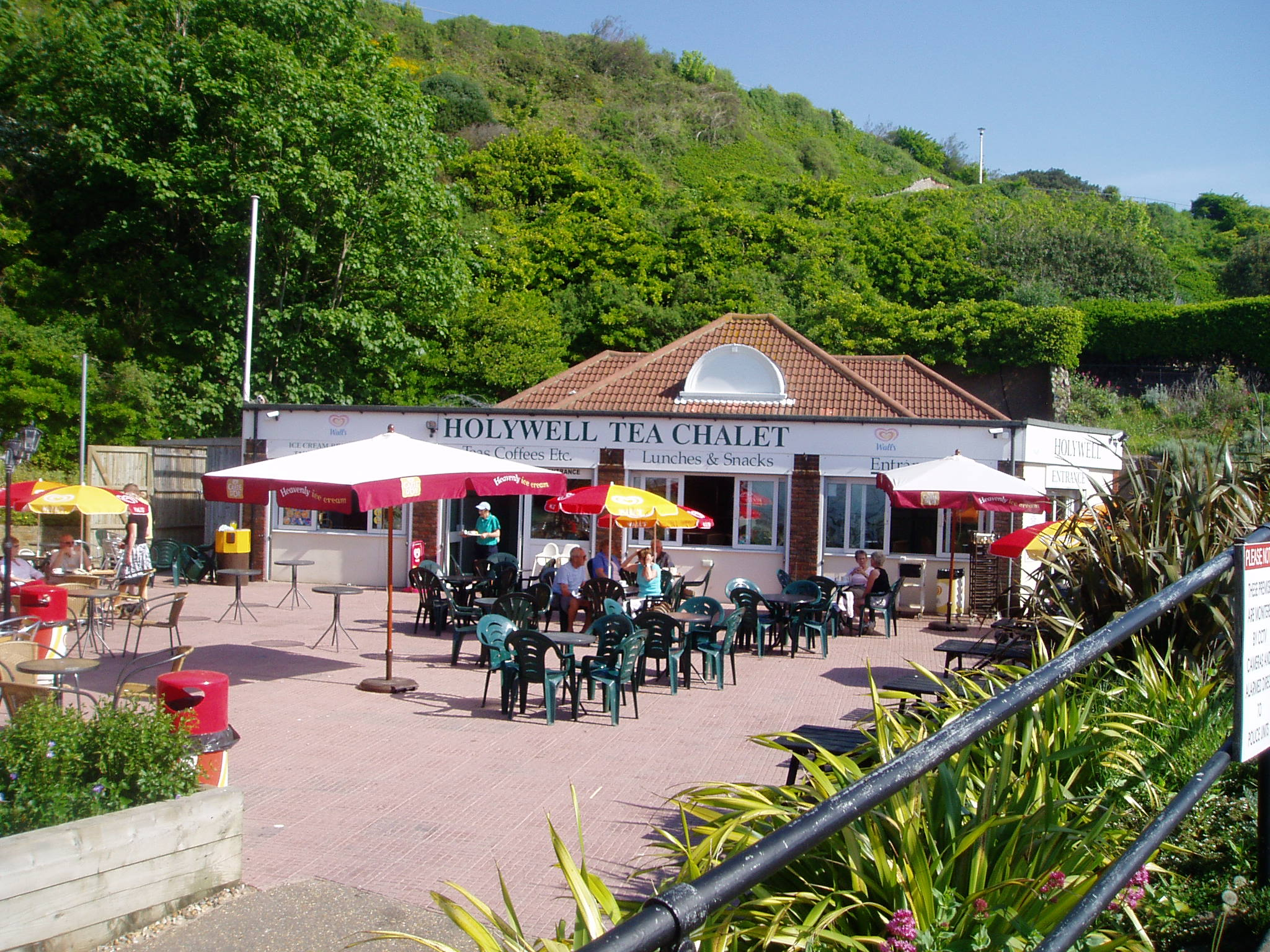
Holywell tea chalet, which was enlarged after World War Two, is situated at the westerly end of the lower promenade.

The pinnacle was formerly known locally as Gibraltar, and the ground around here was the site of lime kilns which were worked by the fishermen. In 1905, the town council laid out a public garden, named somewhat loosely The Holywell Retreat, on the site of a disused chalk pit known as The Gore some 400 metres to the northeast of the Holywell fishing settlement. A tea chalet was later built in the garden and the area above was redesigned in the Italianate style after World War I to provide work for the unemployed. The Council later erected beach chalets above the lower promenade. In 1935, one of the chalets was set aside for the use of King George V and Queen Mary during their visit to the town. More chalets were constructed in the 1950s; as of 2009 there were 69 brick-built chalets available for annual rent.

=== Second World War ===
During the Second World War, Canadian troops in Eastbourne set up a rifle range in Whitbread Hollow, although their official War Diaries refer to this as the Holywell Range. The targets were near the cliff edge and sentries were posted to ensure range safety. Cliff-scaling exercises were also carried out here. The Canadians also referred to the 'Hollywell gun position' which was the site of a Bofors anti-aircraft gun; again this was some distance from what is commonly known as Holywell, being situated on the footpath at the western end of the seafront - an area known locally as the Foot of Beachy Head.

== Etymology ==
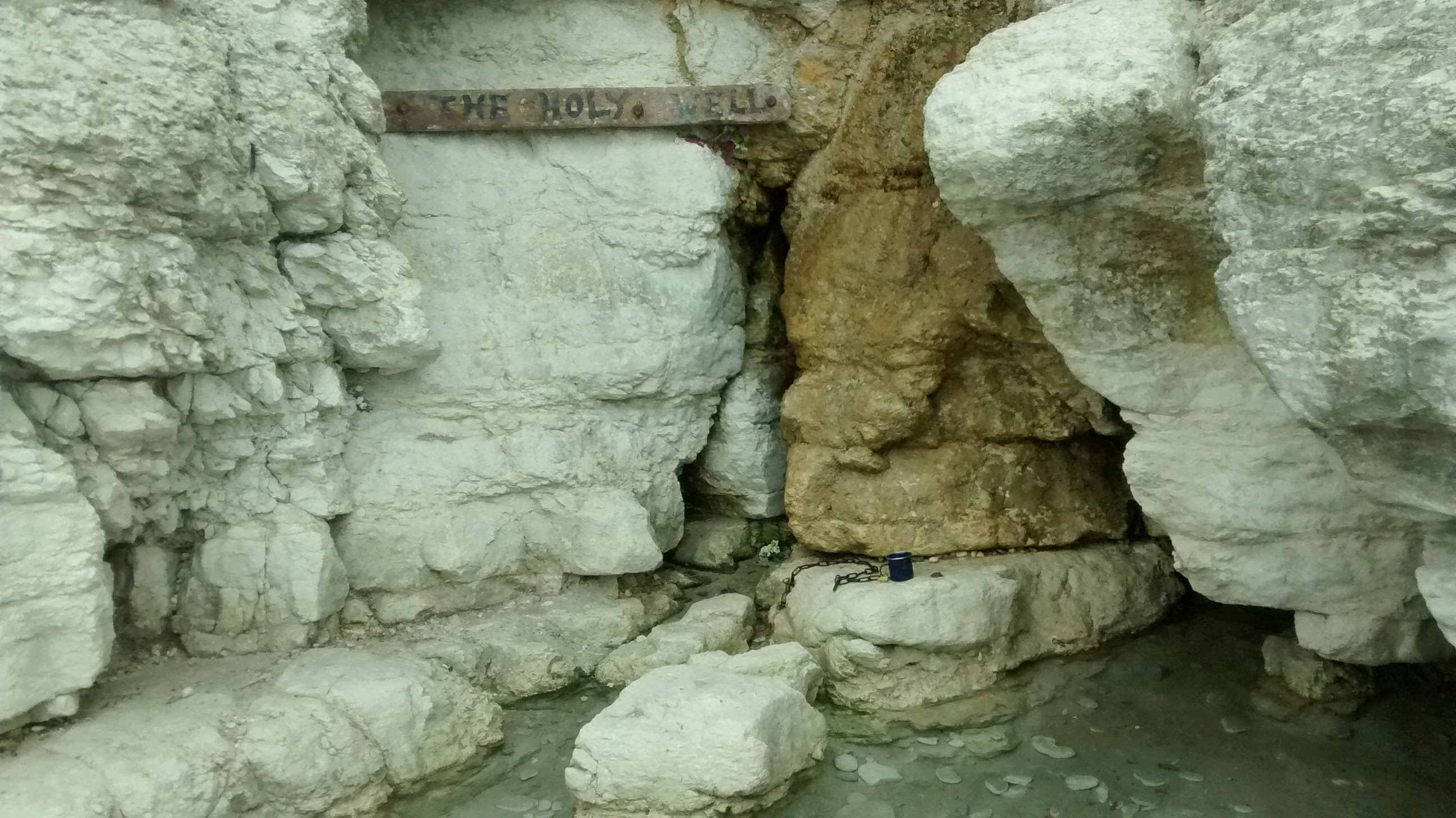
The "holy" well in Holywell, Eastbourne which may have given the name to that area of Eastbourne.

Some historians trying to find a reason for the name Holy Well have associated it with the Chapel of St Gregory which is presumed to have existed near the South Cliff Tower in Bolsover Road. This, however, is some way distant from the present Holywell. The fresh water springs issuing from the low cliffs below the fishing settlement are mentioned in James Royer’s 1787 guide, Eastbourne – A Descriptive Account of that Village. The guide reports that "one of the springs is called Holy-well, supposed to be so named from the many advantages received from drinking those waters". In 1861, another book, Eastbourne as a Resort for Invalides [sic] states: "At Holywell there is a chalybeate spring, the curative properties of which have given the name of the Holy Well.' However, a subsequent analysis of the water demonstrated that it had no particular ‘curative properties". The original meaning of "well" is a place where water welled out of the ground – in other words, a spring.

There are therefore two possible origins of the name Holywell. It could have been the spring used by a holy man or a spring close to a holly tree. However, the persistence of the local pronunciation ("holly well") would appear to favour the latter.

== Chalk Pit Cottages ==
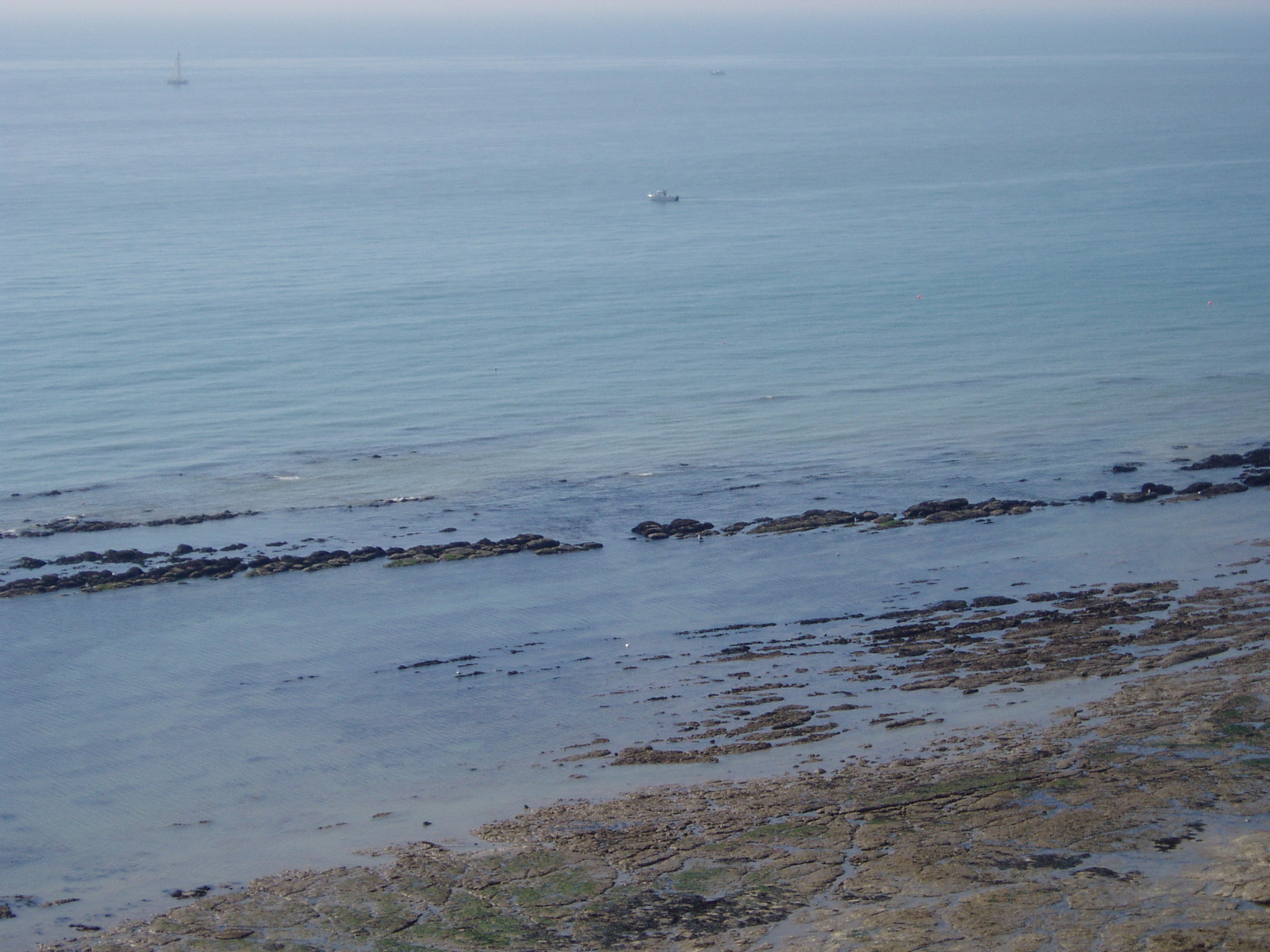
This photograph taken at low tide from the top of The Pinnacle clearly shows the gap cut through the reef by the fishermen

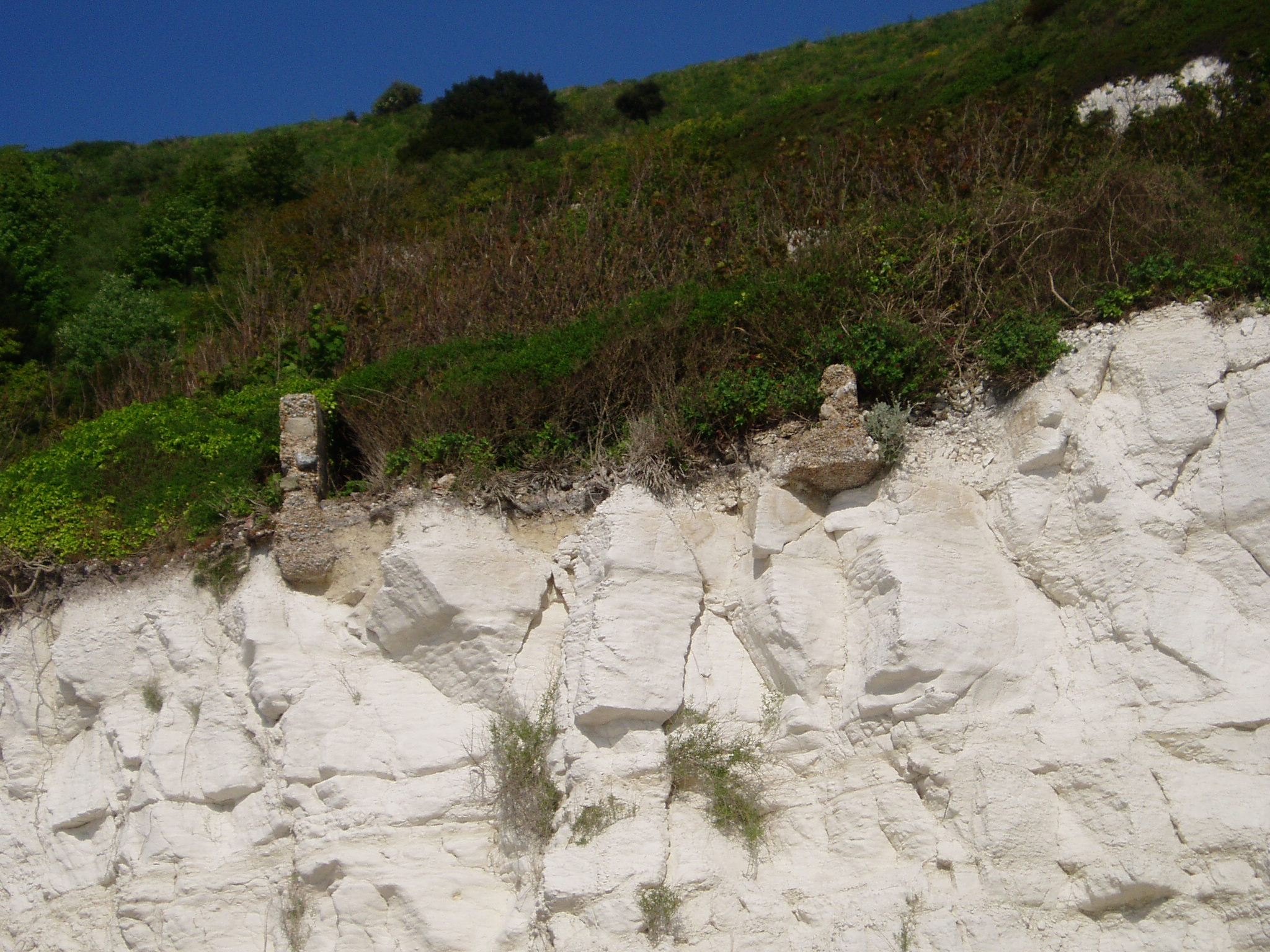
All that remains of the cottages at Holywell are some foundations. Large parts have already fallen over the cliff and the process is on-going.

A map dated 1875 shows Chalk Pit Cottages with three fishermen's net shops behind them on the eastern side of the settlement. Another cottage (name uncertain) was located some two hundred metres to the west. Between the two sets of cottages was a sloping path to the beach via which boats were raised and lowered. The fishermen cut a narrow passage through the reef of rocks off-shore to provide access to the beach at low tide.

=== Weircombe Cottage ===
Weircombe Cottage is shown on higher ground to the east of the Pinnacle in the 1875 map. This seems to have had no connection with the fishermen's cottages. During the inter-war years, it was occupied by the actress and singer Winifred Barnes (1892–1935), and her sister. The latter continued to live at the cottage after Winifred's death. By that time it was the property of the Council. Local auctioneers Edgar Horn cleared the cottage and sold the contents; a large amount of silver antiques were found in an outside lavatory before the cottage then only a few feet from the cliff edge was demolished in the late 1980s.

== Holywell and Eastbourne’s water supply ==
Eastbourne’s original water supply was derived from the spring and pond in the old town at Motcombe. In 1857 a reservoir was created in what is now Motcombe Gardens; two years later the Eastbourne Waterworks Company was founded by the 7th Duke of Devonshire and this enterprise took over the Motcombe reservoir. Prior to 1896, the main water supply for the town had been drawn from the Bedford Well, near the present Whitley Road railway bridge. Pumping had started here in 1883, an inauguration attended by the future King Edward VII and Queen Alexandra. However, in the autumn of 1895, complaints were received that the town’s water tasted brackish and a decision was taken to extract water from Holywell. One year later, the hamlet at Holywell was taken over by the local water board. Rumours abounded that the womenfolk had sold their cottages to the water board while their husbands were out at sea, but the community was moved for reasons of public health – human habitation could not be countenanced on top of a water catchment area.

The water board's successors still own the site, and there is a pumping station but little evidence of the hamlet itself, as by now even most of the foundations of the cottages have gone over the cliff.

== Telegraph cable ==
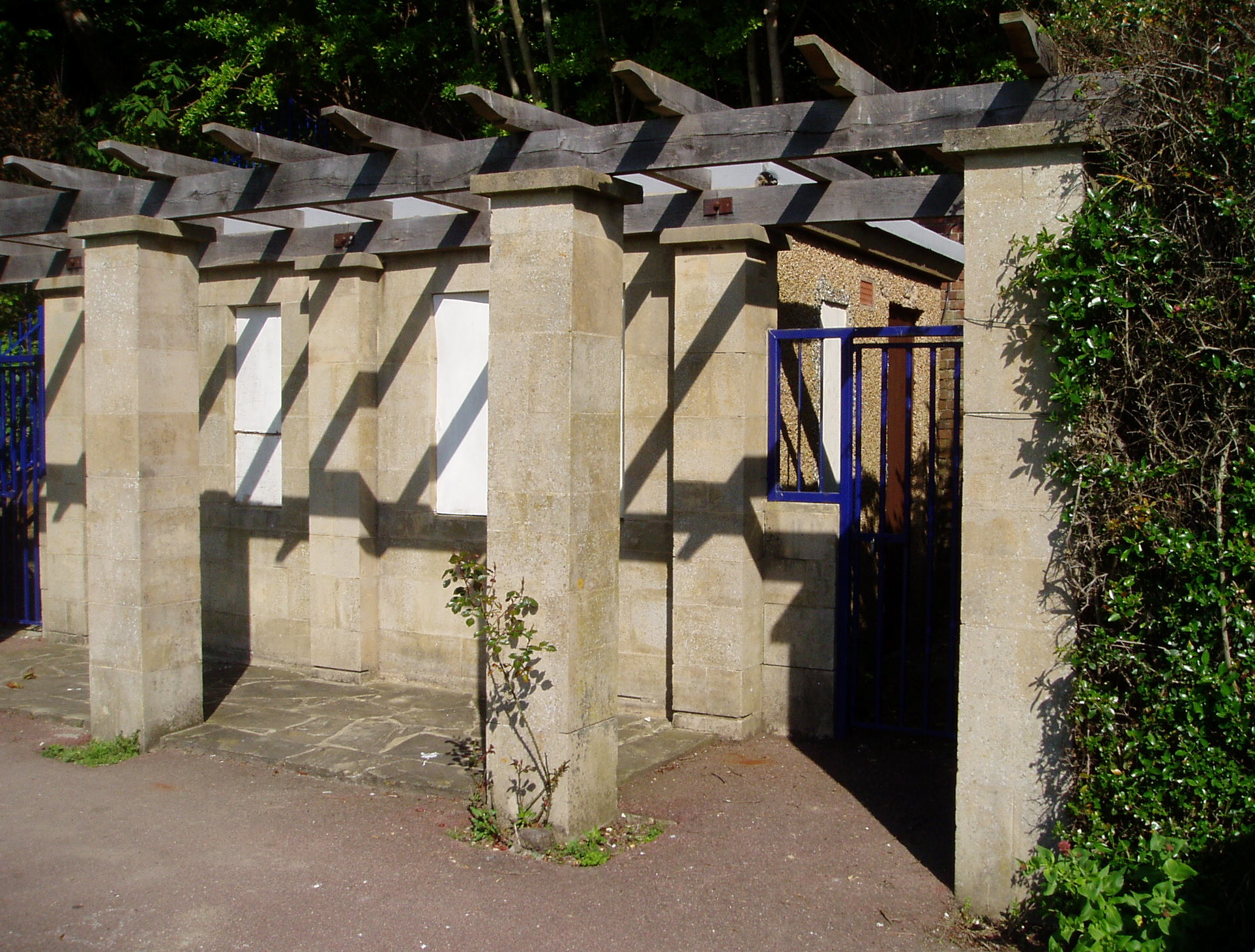
Former terminal building of the Holywell-Dieppe telegraph cable

A cross-Channel telegraph cable was brought ashore at Holywell (on what is now Beach Number 1) in 1861 and terminated in a so-called "landing shed" – the latter probably located in the old Gore chalk pit. In 1922, when the Italian Gardens were laid out, the cable was extended from the landing shed and connected to terminal equipment in a small building (still extant) at the entrance to the gardens.

In May 1940, HMS Jaguar was involved in Operation Quixote, when the six telegraph cables between the East Coast of England and the German islands of Borkum and Nordeney were severed. A signal from the Admiralty dated 12 June 1940 ordered that four other cables that had not been cut during Quixote should now be dealt with as they had only been cut on the beach. One of those cut on the beach was the Holywell – Dieppe Telegraph Cable (1861–1922); the three others ran from the Cuckmere to Le Havre and had been laid in 1900 (Western Union), 1917 and 1918.

Dangerous rusting strands of the old cable could still be seen on the beach in the early 1950s. These have since been removed and a careful search of the terminal building in 2004 revealed no vestiges whatsoever of cable or terminal equipment.
