= Clovelly-Kepplestone =

School in Eastbourne, England

Coordinates: 50.756°N 0.273°E

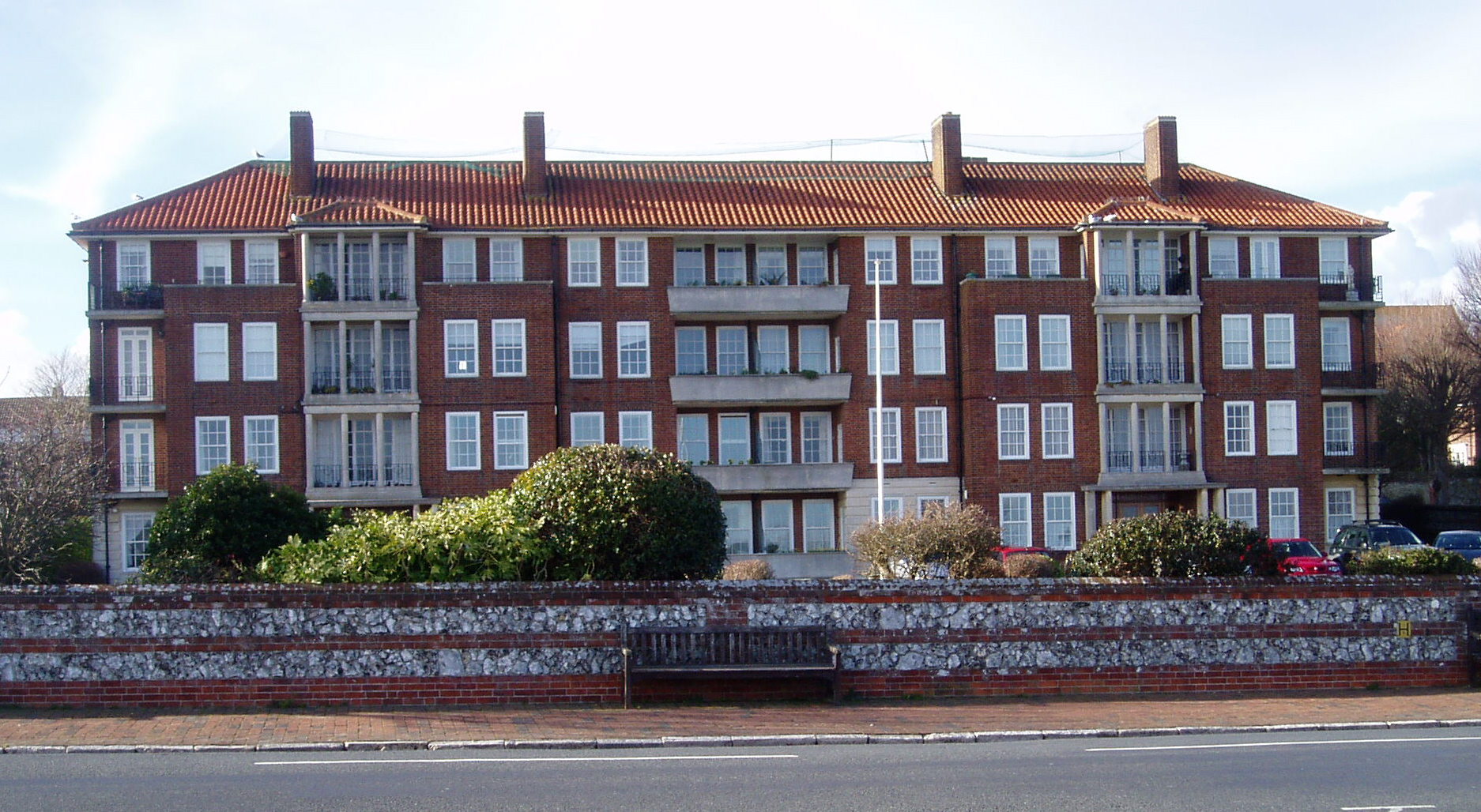
Kepplestone flats on Eastbourne seafront, built just prior to the Second World War, stand on what was the playing field in front of the former school.

Clovelly-Kepplestone was a private boarding school for girls in Eastbourne, Sussex. It existed from 1908 until 1934 and was located in Staveley Road, just off the seafront in the Meads district of the town. Known to staff and pupils as "Clo-Kepp", it came about following a merger of two schools: the "Ladies and Kindergarten School, Clovelly", and the "Ladies School, Kepplestone". At its peak in the 1920s, the school had some 150–160 pupils.

== The principal – Frances Anna Browne ==
The founder and driving force behind Clovelly-Kepplestone was Frances Anna Browne, whose first venture was a dame preparatory school for boys in Eastbourne, St Bede's.A capable woman of considerable strength of character, she was the daughter of an Irish clergyman, Rev Neligan, Chaplain to the Lord Lieutenant of Ireland. Possessing no academic qualifications whatsoever, Mrs Browne came to Eastbourne after her husband, Rev F H Browne, Headmaster of Ipswich School, took his own life in the summer of 1894.

In the summer of that year, Mrs Browne wrote to the Council of Eastbourne College proposing to take boarders, who would be sent to the college as dayboys. This was initially approved by the headmaster but opposed by the housemasters, who objected to competition from someone who was not even a member of the teaching staff. Finally a compromise was reached whereby she was permitted to open a preparatory school (maximum age normally 14) which would primarily feed pupils to the college. During the Michaelmas Term of 1894, "St Bede's – Eastbourne College Preparatory School" opened in Blackwater Road with four pupils under the supervision of Mrs Browne's headmaster, Mr Burnett. By 1897, the school roll at St Bede's was approaching 40, with a corresponding reduction at the college, now without its own preparatory classes. Alarmed, the College Council proposed that an annual capitation fee of £10 per boy be paid by Mrs Browne, who defended her ground stoutly in a number of long and baffling letters before agreeing to a temporary compromise of a guinea a year.

Her firmness can be explained by the conflict between her late husband and the governors of Ipswich School – she would not allow herself to be browbeaten. This background is mentioned in Too Late to Lament, the autobiography of her son, Maurice Browne, known as the theatrical manager responsible for Journey's End. Maurice Browne states that his father's plans to improve the standard of accommodation for domestic staff led to a dispute which, coupled with heavy losses in stocks and shares and a history of drink, led to his resignation and suicide.

With the original premises no longer big enough to accommodate its pupils, Mrs Browne decided to purchase Clovelly, a large detached house also in Blackwater Road, Eastbourne. Relations between Mrs Browne and the college became strained, the latter proposing a fee of £50 – £60 annually for any boy remaining at St Bede's over the age of twelve. In September 1900, the new headmaster of the college urged the council to increase the capitation fee to 14 shillings per term. This was unacceptable to her and the college gave notice that the arrangement with St Bede's would terminate at the end of 1901. However, by this time Mrs Browne had plans for her own girls' school and decided that the sale of St Bede's would be facilitated if agreement with the college could be reached. She sold St Bede's in the autumn of 1901 to Mr G H Gowring, Headmaster of Berkhamsted, who tried unsuccessfully to maintain a connection with the college.

== Mrs Browne's first school for girls ==
Having vacated Clovelly in Blackwater Road, Mrs Browne moved to a house in St John's Road, Meads, which she renamed Clovelly. This is described in 1905 as "Clovelly Educational Home for Girls and Kindergarten for Children". In 1907, the Eastbourne Gazette refers to the annual prize-giving as "a fashionable gathering" and reports the Headmaster of Eastbourne College as saying that the school was starting on the right lines and hoping to provide continuity of education from Kindergarten to a Senior Department. The school is advertised as "Clovelly Ladies School" until 1908, when it moved to its final location in Staveley Road, having merged with "Kepplestone Ladies School", which had previously been at Kelsey Manor at Beckenham in Kent.

== Clovelly becomes Clovelly-Kepplestone ==
In the autumn of 1906, another girls' school, Queenwood, moved from its two houses at the bottom of Staveley Road to purpose-built premises in Darley Road. Queenwood's previous buildings were taken over (probably in 1907) by "Kepplestone Ladies School" from Beckenham in Kent, whose principals were Miss Esther Tait-Reid and Miss C Wall. The first speech day of Clovelly-Kepplestone was in July 1908, when prizes were presented by Mrs Browne's brother, The Bishop of Auckland. It was made clear that Miss Tait-Reid would concern herself with the scholastic side whereas Mrs Browne would concentrate on the domestic arrangements. Although no mention was made of business matters, it was to be Mrs Browne with her many fashionable contacts who made this her domain. A brochure produced towards the end of the First World War states that, "Mrs Browne and Miss Tait-Reid receive pupils of good standing, whose parents wish them to have the benefit of the best modern education combined with healthy and home-life surroundings." There followed a list of dignitaries who had promised to act as referees: The Lord Archbishop of Dublin, Sir Edward Carson, Baron and Baroness de Liser of Bohemia, and the Viceroy and Vicereine of India, Lord and Lady Willingdon. Pupils included a member of the Jordanian Royal Family, the daughter of Muhammed Ali Jinnah, the first President of Pakistan, and HRH Princess Amrit Kaur of Kapurthala, who was later to marry the Rajah of Mandi.

Due to poor health, Miss Tait-Reid gradually became less involved with the school and by 1917, Mrs Browne is described as the sole principal in Gowlands directory of Eastbourne. After the First World War expansion took place and a junior school with a separate principal was set up at Leighton Lodge, also in Staveley Road. In 1921, an established school, "St Margaret's", was acquired and ran as "Clovelly-Kepplestone Junior Ladies School". In 1923, Leighton Lodge was turned into the Domestic Science House.

== School colours and uniform ==
The school flag was azure blue and sea green with a hint of gold. In winter, the uniform consisted of navy blue coats and navy felt hats with hat-band and badge; but white coats and black hats on Sundays. In summer, girls wore white blouses and navy blue skirts with Panama hats and, on Sundays, white suits and white coats with black hats. The school badge, the interwoven letters CK, was in cream, green and white, as was the hat band worn on the Panamas. Belts were awarded for special merit – green for deportment.

== Life at the school ==
Each term began with the pupils assembling at Victoria Station in London to catch the school train to Eastbourne, where (in the early days) a convoy of horse-drawn carriages was waiting to take them in procession to Meads. With the departure of Miss Tait-Reid, Mrs Brown was obliged to appoint a resident headmistress to take charge of the academic management as she was not a graduate. The teaching staff consisted of a dozen or so graduates and there were three fully qualified visiting staff. There were two matrons, a nursing sister and a nanny for the younger children. Allocation to forms was arranged according to ability, but in the dining room the girls sat at tables according to age. After the Upper IV, there was a choice of curriculum: some parents preferred their daughters to continue to matriculation, but others opted for a full domestic science qualification which included cookery, laundry, upholstery and home nursing. Thus girls were prepared to be competent in all housekeeping skills. The education was to a high standard although weaker in science due to the lack of extensive laboratories – a situation which was not at all uncommon in the 1920s and 1930s. French, history and maths were well taught. The teaching of art was of a high order and music was encouraged at all levels.

Attention was focused on the maintenance of good health. Food was good and plentiful and there was regular exercise in the open air. Windows would often be left wide open and one of the abiding impressions of the school for many pupils was the sense of sun pouring in and being reflected in polished corridors.

Feared but respected by pupils and staff alike, the imperious Mrs Browne insisted on strict rules, while still cultivating a family atmosphere. Girls were told not to knock when entering her morning room because they would not do so before entering the morning room of their own home.

== Recreation and social activities ==
Girls dressed for dinner on Monday and Thursday evenings, as well as most Fridays. They also dressed on Saturdays when dinner was followed by ballroom dancing, girls partnering each other to gramophone records. The Dramatic Society rehearsed on Monday evenings, while Tuesday evenings were given over to "sewing for charity", the main beneficiaries being a bazaar for waifs and strays or the children at the nearby All Saints Convent. One evening was designated "freak night" when girls would wear anything they liked – some hairstyles and attire similar to those of the punks 60 years hence. This was introduced during the First World War to cheer everyone up and continued into the 1920s before being abandoned. On Thursdays, senior girls retired to the drawing room to sit on the floor reading or listening to music performed by girls and mistresses. There were dancing classes on Friday evenings, during which attention was paid to the Court Curtsy, for many girls would later be presented as debutantes. On Sunday and Wednesday evenings, letters were written to parents and left at the office for posting. To discourage contact with boy friends, it was forbidden to post by any other means. Nevertheless, some girls became expert at flicking a letter into the wall letterbox outside the main gate as the crocodile (a line of children walking in pairs) passed.

The school had a flourishing dramatic society which stimulated some pupils to go on the professional stage in later life. Plays were performed twice yearly, with a stage erected in the gymnasium. In the early days, music featured prominently in the school's activities. In addition to the traditional school orchestra, there was a fifth form jazz band, conducted during 1921 by the future Rahnee of Mandi, Amrit Knaur.

The senior school was surrounded by boys' preparatory schools – the cricket field of one such school adjoined Clovelly-Kepplestone's playing field. Many girls had brothers or cousins who were invited to lunch once a month on what was known as "Brothers Sunday". A certain amount of horseplay was permitted in the gymnasium and pocket money was spent at the school shop, run for the benefit of special funds such as the provision of pocket money and extras for a girl attending a school for the blind. An important event in June was "Clovelly Day", a char-a-banc trip to Wannock Tea Gardens to commemorate the amalgamation of Clovelly and Kepplestone in 1908.

Church was compulsory at St John's Church in Meads every Sunday for all girls of the Church of England, but there was complete religious tolerance. As a consequence, about a third of the girls were Jewish and a Rabbi came on Saturdays to conduct a service. Holy Days were kept when they occurred during term and Jewish girls were not required to attend morning prayers, which was unusual in boarding schools at that time. Although in the lower forms, girls were not encouraged to discuss religious topics among themselves, such discussions and comparisons were frequent in the fifth forms, and proved a great source of interest and enlightenment. Many nationalities were represented: Czech, Indian, Latin American, Persian (as Iranians were generally known in those days), Portuguese, Spanish and Turkish.

== School magazines ==
The annual magazines were produced by a local printer (Strange the Printer) and consisted of some 70 – 100 pages of news, and contributions of poetry and prose by girls. Reports from Old Girls refer to a mixture of "a gay life" and "serious pursuits". (In the 1920s and 1930s, the word gay meant "light-hearted and carefree"; it had not yet generally acquired the meaning of "homosexual".) At least one old girl took an active part against the General Strike of 1926 by driving policemen in Hampshire. There are also contributions from abroad since many girls came from or went to the Empire. The All Asia Women's Conference was opened in Lahore by an old girl, the Rani of Mandi. Each magazine carries a diary of school events such as a concert by Fritz Kreisler at a local theatre, a lecture on Sir Ernest Shackleton's expedition to the South Pole. Sir Ernest and Lady Shackleton lived near to the school and the latter helped with the Girl Guides and presented prizes at the annual Speech Day in 1926. Another magazine reports on a lecture of the exploits of Captain Hill (Mrs Browne's son-in-law) as a secret agent in Russia; yet another relates the participation by girls at the "Waifs and Strays Bazaar" at Eastbourne Town Hall.

Miss Tait-Reid is frequently mentioned in the school magazines. In later life she devoted more time to writing and translating. The magazine for 1927 mentions the publication of her novel The Persistent Heritage and in the issue for 1930 there are her translations of Italian and Provençal troubadour songs. By 1931, she had become ill again and was unable to attend the annual Speech Day.

== A family business ==
Mrs Browne's younger daughter, Miss "Frankie" Browne, taught elocution. Somewhat unusually for a single woman at that time, she adopted a child whose mother had died; the girl was subsequently enrolled at the school. This girl later went on to become head girl and then to follow a distinguished academic career. Frankie, gifted musically and artistically, had been on the stage and was responsible for drama, assisted by her friend Greta Douglas, who ran an art and drama finishing school at "Camoys Court" (known as "Bouglee") in Barcombe. Many girls went on to this school after leaving Clovelly-Kepplestone.

Maurice Browne, Mrs Browne's son, had many links with the theatre and would invite well-known visitors to stay at the school. A former member of the domestic staff recalls Paul Robeson, who was playing Othello to Maurice Browne's Iago at the Savoy Theatre in 1930. Robeson would entertain the family and their friends in the drawing room, his mighty voice keeping the servants awake on the top floor.

== Retirement of Mrs Browne ==
Mrs Browne, in poor health, retired to Putney in the autumn of 1930, selling out to finance a pension on the clear understanding that her daughter would continue to be Principal. Douglas Hogg, Lord Hailsham was the distinguished guest at the prize giving that year and, before the presentations, the chairman of the board, Mr T Simpson, told parents how he and his Co-Director, Sir Harry Haward, had offered Mrs Browne a seat on the Board and that they had every confidence in Miss Browne as her successor. In the magazine of that year, Mrs Browne mentions the "heavy financial losses experienced by schools in the past few years and her regrets that it had been impossible to raise the £2000 needed to build a large school hall.”

The school continued under the direction of Miss Browne but the Board of Governors, due no doubt to the prevailing economic situation in the country, soon disposed of St Margaret's (Junior School). The 1993 Kelly's shows a boys’ preparatory school, its name changed to St Augustine's and having no connection with Clovelly-Kepplestone. The magazine for 1931 reports that " . . . C-K has contracted, with Juniors under the same roof as Seniors since last January."

== The end of an era ==
At the Speech Day in the summer of 1934, a bombshell was dropped. To the stunned assembly of parents, teachers and pupils Miss Frankie Browne announced that she had been told the previous day by the chairman of the board that a new principal had been appointed for the coming term and that she would be leaving. The Board had also claimed that she had no flair for parents. Speaking with great bitterness, she said that she appeared to be responsible in some measure for the national depression and consequent fall in numbers in the school – although according to official figures by the Board of Education, numbers had fallen far less than in many other of the schools in the town.

Miss Browne stated further that the Executive Committee of the Old Girls’ Club had given her a vote of confidence and that a letter of protest had been signed by every member of the teaching staff and sent to the Board. The Speech Day developed into an indignation meeting with protests by many parents who said that they would not keep their daughters at the school under a different principal.

Local newspapers advertised that the school would open for the new term in September 1934 under Mrs Lucas Jarratt, late Principal of Crescent House School, Bedford. But most parents remained loyal to the Brownes and transferred their children to a new school to be opened by Frankie and "run in the best traditions of Clovelly-Kepplestone". Somehow the new school was made ready for September 1934 at The Hoo, a house designed by Sir Edwin Lutyens just outside Eastbourne in Church Street, Willingdon. At the same time, St Bernard's School at Bexhill was closing due to the retirement of its principal and a merger was arranged.

Clovelly-Kepplestone lingered on for about a term after Frankie's departure, but at the end of 1935, the building is reported in the local press as "derelict". The parents who had removed their daughters without giving a term's notice were billed for those fees and one parental couple brought a test case against the school alleging breach of contract by the Board since the system had been changed without consultation. However, this case went against the parents. Local directories list nothing further on the site until the new Kepplestone Flats, numbers 4 and 5, appear in 1939. During the Second World War some of the flats were occupied by Canadian officers and their wives.

With the school, also collapsed the value of Mrs Browne's shares and hence her pension. In 1934, the year when the Governors dispensed with the services of Frankie, more shocking news arrived: her youngest son, Ted, had committed suicide. In her last year, her daughter's new school at The Hoo was facing ruin and Clovelly-Kepplestone, under the Board's new principal, was in its death throes. Already in poor health and now mortified by the demise of her school and the predicament of her daughter, she died at The Hoo in May 1935 in her 83rd year. The Eastbourne Gazette reports that "Marsie" (nickname not from "Ma" but from the play A Message from Mars) was laid to rest at Willingdon. The service conducted by the Vicar of Willingdon, Rev Douglas Merritt, a former pupil of her first school, St Bede's. The funeral was attended by local people, former staff and pupils.

Speech Days at "The Hoo School for Girls" are reported in Eastbourne local papers in 1935 and 1936. However, weakened by the split and the prevailing economic situation, the new school did not prosper. Moreover, Frankie Browne's talents lay with music and drama – not business; without the influence and guidance of her mother, she proved unable to manage. The strict regime of the old school was relaxed: "the School is known as the school with no rules", she said in a speech to parents in 1935. "We have no rules because children are expected, and consequently do, behave like ordinary responsible human beings."

In the company of a member of staff, Frankie began to drink and became an alcoholic. Gradually girls were withdrawn; her new school was on the verge of collapse, finally closing in 1936. She moved to London to look after an invalid uncle, the former Chaplain of Clovelly-Kepplestone. Maurice Browne tells how she served prison sentences and attempted suicide. In fact, she was found guilty in 1940 of selling furniture which did not belong to her and was admitted to Holloway, where she went straight into the infirmary. Subsequently, she was placed on probation, on condition of residence at a nursing home for alcoholics where she remained for over a year. She then took a post at an aircraft factory, in charge of ordering spares; she did this successfully until stresses brought about a relapse. She died "having lost her will to live" after a serious abdominal operation in the early 1950s.

Thus Clovelly-Kepplestone, once a thriving school with a good reputation, suffered its downfall. Mrs Browne, following the suicide of her husband in 1894, had been left with little means and four young children to support. A lesser woman would have despaired at this point but she was made of sterner stuff – an indomitable woman of great resilience. Her outstanding characteristics were: practicality, humour and her capacity to carry on through adversity. Photographs of her early widowhood show a dignified, alert attractive woman, despite the Victorian widow's weeds. These qualities gave her the will to survive and make a success of her first two schools (St Bede's and Clovelly) although she failed for various reasons to realise the full value of each when they were sold.

In his autobiography, Maurice Browne writes of the end of Clovelly-Kepplestone and its effect on his mother: "When the final collapse came she was on her death bed; her three surviving children tried to keep the news from her. But there was no one, they believed, who had ever known wholly what that wise old woman observed or thought. On her grave they set a bird-bath, on the bird-bath, a stone owl."

== Notable alumni ==
- Amrit Kaur of Mandi (1904–1948)
