= Sirichok Sopha =

Thai politician (born 1967)

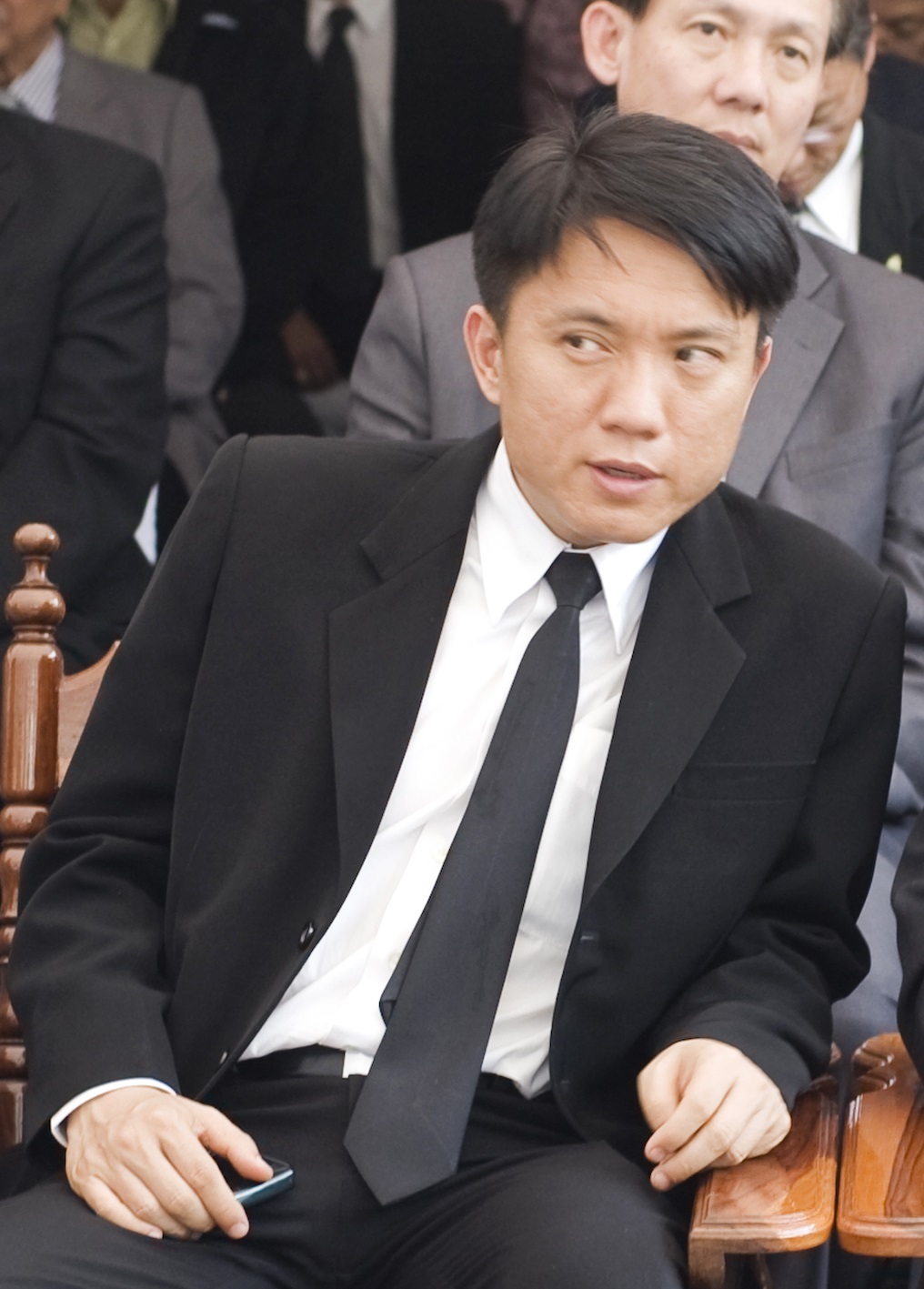
Sirichok Sopha in 2010

Sirichok Sopha (Thai: ศิริโชค โสภา; born 14 June 1967 in Bang Rak, Bangkok), personal nicknamed Lek (pronounced [lék], Thai: เล็ก, "small"), is a former Thai Democrat Party politician who represented Songkhla Province in the House of Representatives and previously served as Private Secretary to Prime Minister Abhisit Vejjajiva.

== Early life and education ==
The youngest son of three children born to a Lao-born Chinese father and a Thai mother, Sirichok was educated at Assumption College, St Bede's Preparatory School, Eastbourne College, King's College London (BSc in chemistry) and Prince of Songkla University (MBA).

== Career ==
After graduation he worked as a lecturer.

He first stood for election in the 1995 general election in the constituency of Bangkok for the Nam Thai Party (Note: Founded and led by Dr. Amnuay Weerawan.) but was not elected. He also ran for election in Bangkok in the 1996 Thai general election for the Democrat Party, but was also not elected. Sirichok was elected for the first time in the constituency of Songkhla in the 2001 Thai general election.

Politically, he is regarded as being close to Abhisit Vejjajiva, earning him the nickname "Wallpaper", as he often appeared behind Abhisit while giving press interviews.

After the 2023 Thai general election, he announced his retirement from politics.

== Personal life ==
His family business produces squid snacks under the brand Squidy. He owns an aquarium hotel in the Vibhavadi area.

Sirichok is single, and supports Stoke City F.C.
