= St Michael's Church, Brent Knoll =

Church in Somerset, England

Church of St Michael
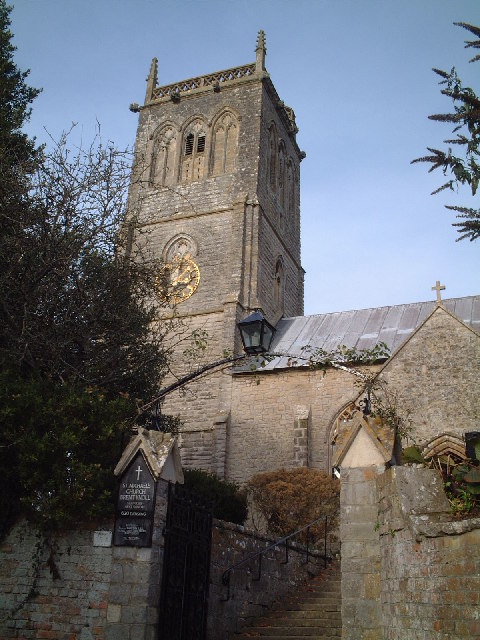

- Location within Somerset

General information
- Location: Brent Knoll, England
- Coordinates: 51.2520°N 2.9539°W
- Completed: 11th century

The Church of St Michael at Brent Knoll, Somerset, England dates from the 11th century but has undergone several extensions and renovations since then. It has been designated as a grade I listed building. There is a Norman doorway however the rest of the church dates from around 1290. The north aisle was built in the late 15th century.

The three-stage tower, which has been dated to around 1397, contains a bell dating from 1777 and made by William Bilbie of the Bilbie family. The church is best known for its unusual carvings on some of its pew ends and in particular the three that make up an allegorical cartoon thought to depict an avaricious Abbot of Glastonbury in the guise of a fox. The pulpit is from the 17th century.

== Architecture ==
The Parish Church of St Michael at Brent Knoll had its origins in the eleventh century, with further construction work taking place in the fourteenth and fifteenth centuries, with a restoration in the nineteenth century. It is built of coursed and squared rubble stone, with lead sheeting on the roofs apart from the chancel roof, which is slated. There are cruciform finials on the gable ends. The church is built mostly in the Perpendicular style, the plan being the nave, the chancel, the north aisle, the fourteenth-century south porch and the south transept, now used as a vestry. The fourteenth-century tower is at the west end and has three stages with set-back buttresses. It is topped by a parapet with pinnacles, and gargoyles to shed the water. The Norman doorway in the south porch has chevron decorations.

The fifteenth-century nave has a wagon roof, and fittings inside the church include an eleventh-century font, a pulpit dated 1637, a Jacobean coffin-stool and chair, and a medieval parish chest. The interior of the church is particularly noted for the bench ends of the pews which are elaborately carved and date to the fourteenth and fifteenth centuries.

The church is used as the venue for a series of musical and arts events each summer.

== See also ==
- List of Grade I listed buildings in Sedgemoor
- List of towers in Somerset
- List of ecclesiastical parishes in the Diocese of Bath and Wells
