= Eastbourne Borough Council elections =

Local government elections in East Sussex, England

Eastbourne Borough Council in East Sussex, England, is elected every four years. Until 2007 one third of the council was elected each year, followed by one year without an election. 27 councillors were elected with 3 each from the 9 wards.

== Council elections ==
For a summary of the council composition after recent council elections, click on the year for the full details of each election.

Boundary changes took place for the 2002 election which reduced the number of seats by 3, leading to the whole council being elected in that year. The council then switched from a system of by-third elections to whole council elections in 2007.

Composition of the council
Year	Conservative	Liberal Democrats (Note: Includes totals for the predecessors of the Liberal Democrats, the Liberal Party and SDP (both of which participated in the Alliance).)	Labour	Independents & Others	Council control after election
Local government reorganisation; council established (33 seats)
1973	10	19	4	0	Liberal
New ward boundaries (30 seats)
1976	25	1	4	0	Conservative
1978	24	4	2	0	Conservative
1979	20	2	8	0	Conservative
1980	19	11	0	0	Conservative
1982	17	12	1	0	Conservative
1983	18	11	1	0	Conservative
1984	14	15	1	0	No overall control
1986	13	17	0	0	Alliance
1987	13	17	0	0	Alliance
1988	16	13	1	0	Conservative
1990	15	13	1	1	No overall control
1991	12	16	1	1	Liberal Democrats
1992	13	17	0	0	Liberal Democrats
1994	11	19	0	0	Liberal Democrats
1995	9	21	0	0	Liberal Democrats
1996	8	22	0	0	Liberal Democrats
1998	12	18	0	0	Liberal Democrats
1999	15	15	0	0	No overall control
2000	18	12	0	0	Conservative
New ward boundaries (27 seats)
2002	12	15	0	0	Liberal Democrats
2003	13	14	0	0	Liberal Democrats
2004	14	13	0	0	Conservative
2006	15	12	0	0	Conservative
New ward boundaries (27 seats)
2007	7	20	0	0	Liberal Democrats
2011	12	15	0	0	Liberal Democrats
2015	9	18	0	0	Liberal Democrats
New ward boundaries (27 seats)
2019	9	18	0	0	Liberal Democrats
2023	8	19	0	0	Liberal Democrats

== Borough result maps ==
2002 results map

2003 results map

2004 results map

2006 results map

2007 results map

2011 results map

2015 results map

2019 results map

2023 results map

== By-election results ==
By-elections occur when seats become vacant between council elections. Below is a summary of recent by-elections; full by-election results can be found by clicking on the by-election name.

By-election	Date	Incumbent party	Winning party
Devonshire	20 June 1996	Liberal Democrats	Conservative
Langney	5 December 1996	Liberal Democrats	Liberal Democrats
Langney	28 August 1997	Liberal Democrats	Liberal Democrats
Ratton by-election	3 September 1998	Liberal Democrats	Conservative
St Anthony's by-election	7 June 2001	Conservative	Conservative
Meads by-election	31 May 2012	Conservative	Conservative
Sovereign by-election	24 November 2016	Conservative	Conservative
Hampden Park by-election	6 May 2021	Liberal Democrats	Liberal Democrats
Sovereign by-election	6 May 2021	Conservative	Conservative
St. Anthony's by-election	6 October 2022	Liberal Democrats	Liberal Democrats
Langney by-election	1 May 2025	Liberal Democrats	Liberal Democrats
Upperton by-election	1 May 2025	Liberal Democrats	Liberal Democrats
