= Eastbourne Airbourne (air show) =

Air show in Eastbourne, England

Airbourne Eastbourne International Air Show
- The former logo before 2022

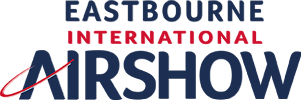
- Logo from 2022
- Status: active
- Genre: Public air show
- Dates: August
- Frequency: Annually
- Location: Eastbourne
- Coordinates: 50.764857°N 0.291567°E
- Country: England
- Established: 1994; 32 years ago
- Most recent: 13-16 August 2026
- Next event: 12-15 August 2027
- Attendance: c. 500,000
- Major events: aerobatic displays static displays
- Organiser: Eastbourne Borough Council
- Website: eastbourneairshow.com

Eastbourne Airbourne, also known as the Eastbourne International Airshow, is a 4-day international air show that runs every August in Eastbourne, East Sussex, England. The event features Battle of Britain memorial flights and aircraft from the RAF and USAF, among others, and enjoys a long relationship with the Red Arrows display team.

Starting in 1994, the event is produced and promoted by Eastbourne Borough Council.

The most recent airshow took place between the 13-16 August 2026. The next dates are yet to be announced. A dedicated FM radio station, "Radio Airbourne", broadcasts on 87.7FM during the event.

== Event format ==
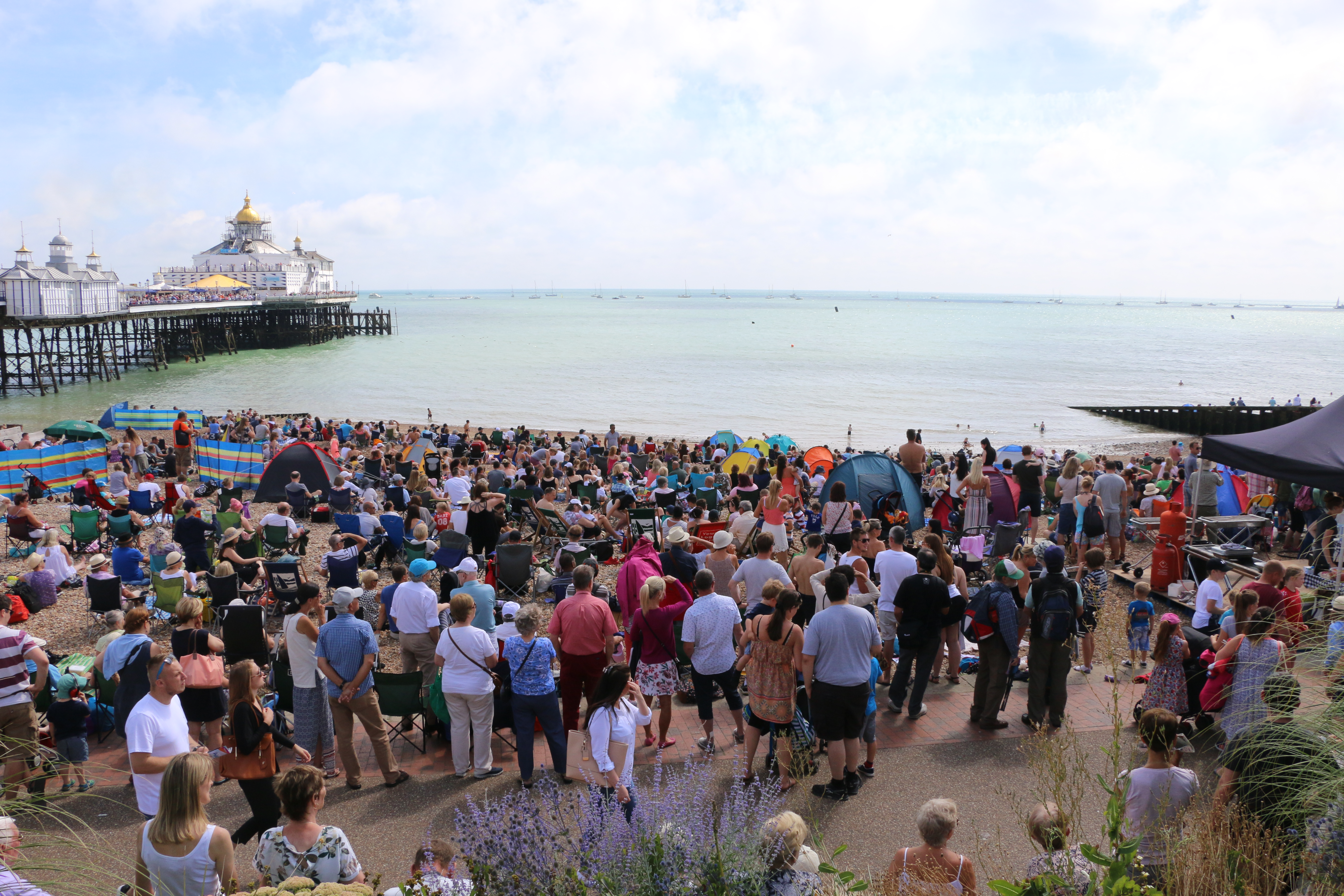
The airshow looking out to the pier.

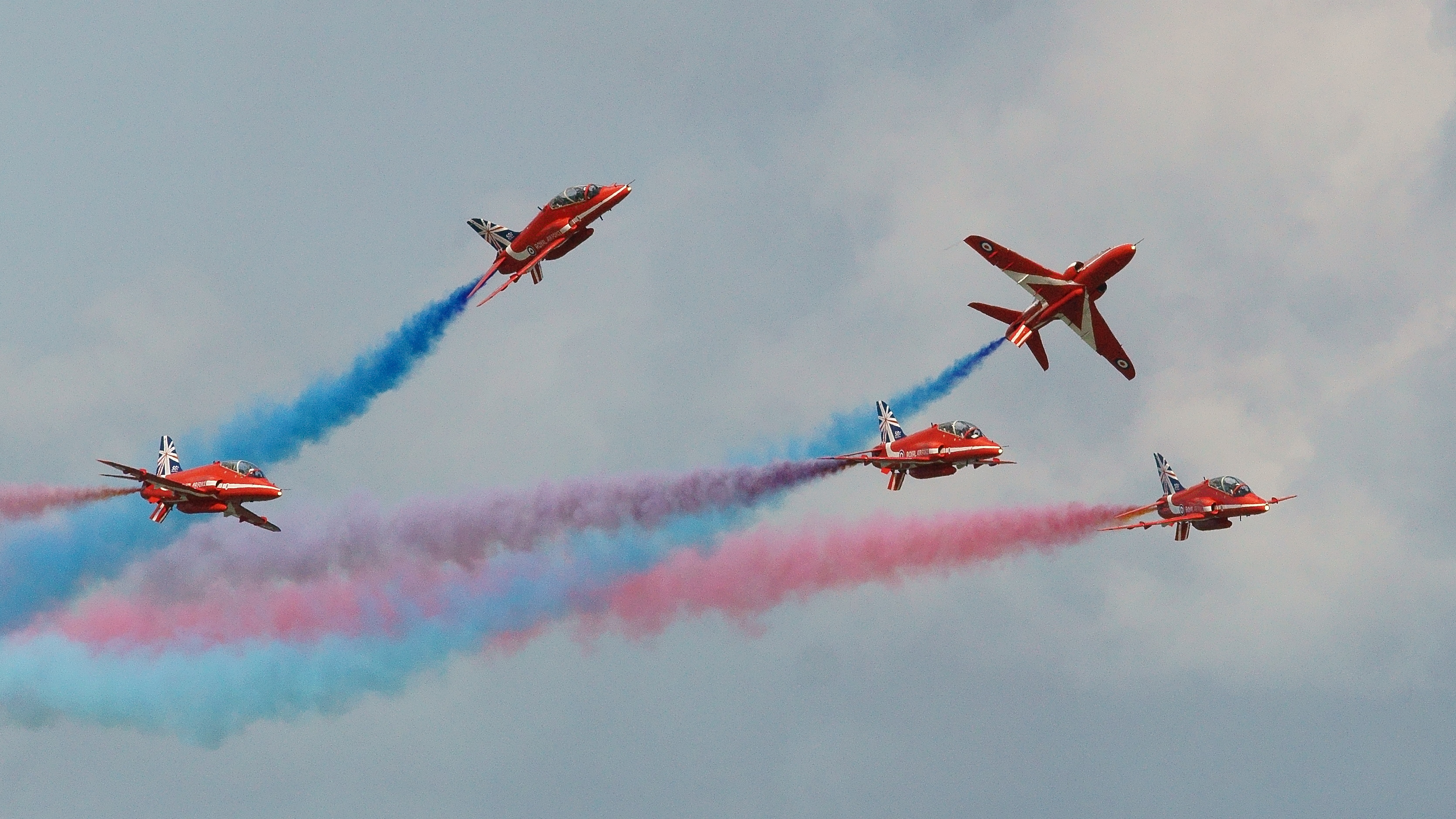
The Red Arrows performing during Airbourne in 2014.

The event is usually held over 2 to 4 days in the middle of August.

Ground displays are typically held on Eastbourne seafront, in the Military Village on the Western Lawns, in the morning and afternoon, while air displays are performed in the skies over the seafront between the pier and the Western Lawns, from lunchtime to mid-afternoon.

== Awards ==
The event was Highly Commended in 2016 at the Visit Britain Awards, organised by the UK's national tourist board.

== Funding ==
Access to the event is free and open to the public, without reservation. The event has been marketed as both the United Kingdom's largest free airshow, and the world's biggest free seafront airshow.

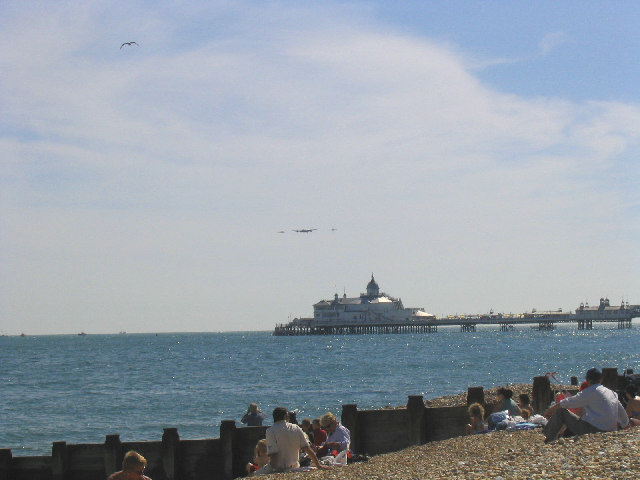
The 'Battle of Britain Memorial Flight', passing over Eastbourne Pier during Airbourne in 2005.

The costs of Airbourne are funded from the budget of Eastbourne Borough Council (EBC), from local taxation and other operating income. The Council claim it is a significant contributor to Eastbourne's tourist income, yet its true value to the town has been disputed locally.

From 2023, Eastbourne Borough Council announced that they would no longer fund the show, due to rising costs, and instead said that the show could continue, as long as the show operated on a cost-netural basis.

=== 2008 charges ===
In 2008, there was particular controversy when EBC decided to introduce a £5 event admission fee, to a part of Eastbourne seafront set aside as a special viewing area, which had previously been accessible to the public for free. The intention behind charging admission was to help cover the show's rising costs, especially in a year when a major event sponsor was sought but not found. However, it caused an outcry in the local press.

That year visitor numbers were down, costs were up and there was an operational loss of "hundreds of thousands of pounds", alongside bad publicity. The local council had initially projected that the event would make a £183,000 profit. In response to the blunders, the council ordered an internal inquiry and subsequently reversed the introduction of admission charges.

Five senior staff members at the council were made redundant in late 2009. The cause was cited as a cost-cutting exercise, but press reports claimed that the 2008 Airbourne finances led to the firings. At the time, Leader of Eastbourne Borough Council David Tutt, said: "We will be investigating what went right, what went wrong and looking very seriously at ways of ensuring the event for future years."

== Safety ==
As with airshows around the world, the event carries high risks to human life, primarily to performing stunt pilots.

Exceptional risks to bystanders from crashed planes are minimised in the design of Airbourne, in part through the performance of stunts over the English Channel, rather than over populated land.

=== Death of Ted Girdler, 2000 ===
Nonetheless, despite all normal safety precautions, on Friday 18 August 2000 former Red Arrows pilot Ted Girdler crashed into the Channel and died, while performing a stunt for Airbourne crowds. He was 62 years old and lived in the neighbouring county of Kent.

Girdler was killed when his Aero L-29 Delfín jet failed to pull up from a diving roll and fell into the sea, watched by a crowd of more than 40,000 people. The main body of the plane was not immediately found and members of the crowd were reported to be traumatised by witnessing the death.

Eyewitness reports in the national press described pandemonium: "Everyone was screaming and shouting. It is incredible that nobody [else] was hurt as there were thousands of people on the seafront. It only just missed a small group of boats. The plane just disappeared and left some debris floating on the surface of the sea." Two swimmers, watching the event from the sea, were treated in hospital after swallowing jet fuel.

Jim Maitland, display co-ordinator for the event, said the diving aileron roll that Mr Girdler was attempting was not a dangerous manoeuvre. Girdler had previously run a flying school at Manston Airport, with his family.

=== Links to Shoreham Disaster, 2015 ===
In 2015, a disastrous accident occurred at Shoreham Airshow, taking place at Shoreham Airport, 20 miles from Eastbourne. 11 people were killed in what became known as the 2015 Shoreham Airshow crash.

Pilot Andy Hill crashed onto a major road, between Eastbourne and Brighton, following a failed attempt at a loop manoeuvre. Hill had performed the same manoeuvre at Eastbourne's Airbourne the week before. A large number of the smaller planes taking part in Airbourne continue to use Shoreham Airport, as a base to perform over Eastbourne.

Following the Shoreham Disaster, the Civil Aviation Authority opened an investigation and later published a review. In response, on behalf of Airbourne, Eastbourne Borough Council issued a public statement saying: "we are confident of being able to introduce any additional safety measures required by the review."
