= Eastbourne Downland Estate =

Downland in East Sussex, England

- IUCN category V (protected landscape/seascape)
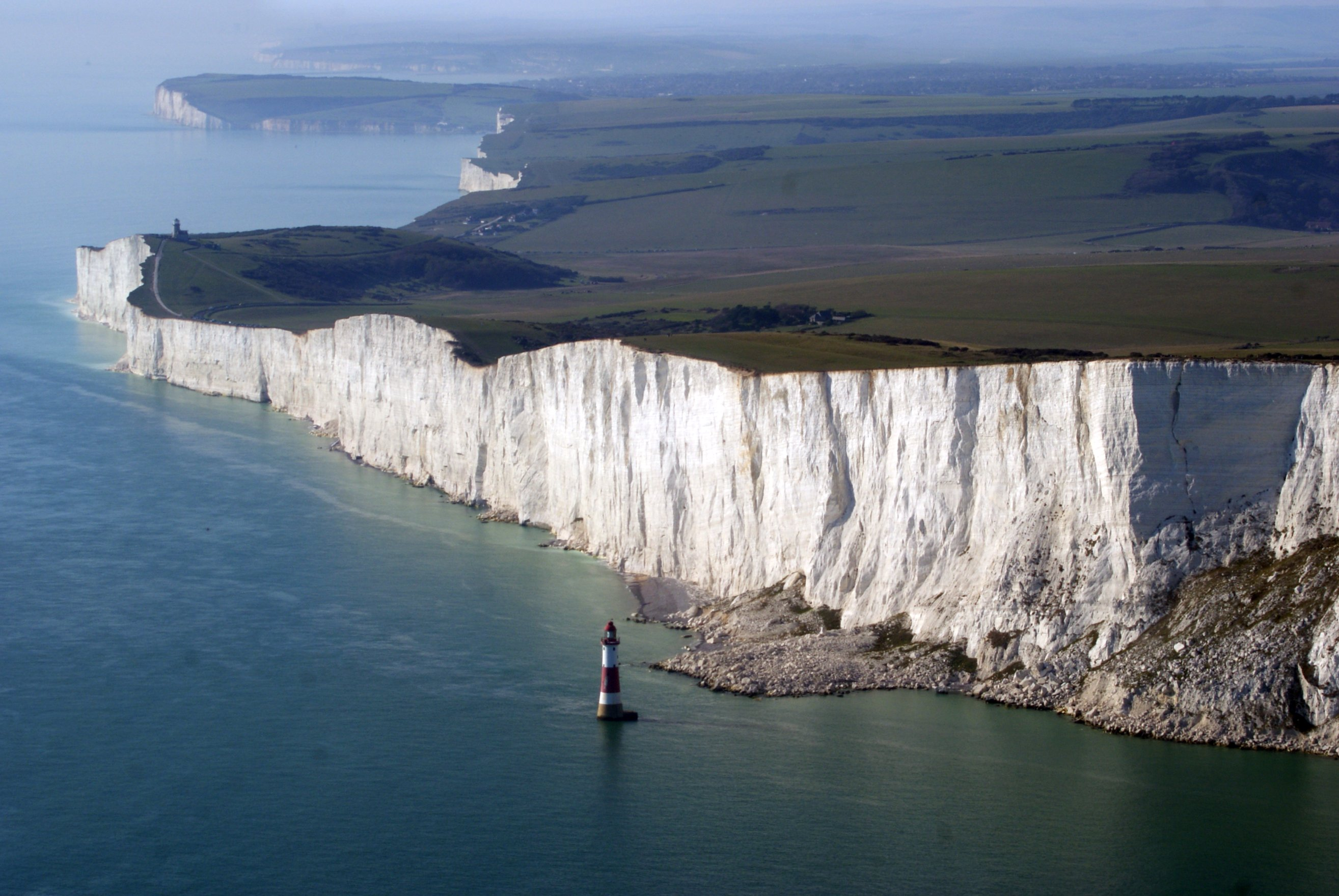
- Beachy Head from the air
- Location: South East, England
- Established: Bought for the public in 1929
- Visitors: 1 million
- Governing body: Farmers, Eastbourne Borough Council, South Downs National Park Authority, Natural England

The Eastbourne Downland Estate is an area of downland at the easternmost end of the South Downs National Park in East Sussex, England. It was bought by the public, following threats to the beauty spots of Beachy Head and the surrounding farmland, which led to a public campaign and Act of Parliament in 1926. It is currently owned and managed, on behalf of the public, by Eastbourne Borough Council.

== Land Use ==
1,199 hectares (2,960 acres) is farmed, while 490 hectares (1,200 acres) is open public access land, including the land around the internationally famed Beachy Head beauty spot and Belle Tout Lighthouse.

The farmland is divided into four farms: Bullock Down Farm, Chalk Farm, Black Robin Farm and Cornish Farm. The farmers pay rent to the people of Eastbourne through Eastbourne Borough Council.

Chalk Farm includes a hotel and learning disabilities centre. The Centre provides: "realistic training and work experience within the setting of a fully functioning hotel... for adults with learning disabilities, when they leave full-time education [and] for adults with learning disabilities of any working age." The ultimate aim of the centre is "to help students to increase their independent living skills as well as their ability to enter the real job market". The hotel was once a Priory, reportedly connected with The Benedictine Abbey of Grestein and once owned by Robert de Norton, the first Norman Lord of Pevensey and half-brother of William the Conqueror.

== 1926 Act of Parliament ==
The Eastbourne Corporation Act of 1926 was passed in both Houses of Parliament. The new law empowered the local authority in the area of the Eastbourne Downland Estate, to increase local taxation to fund a compulsory purchase of the land comprising the Estate.

The purchase was completed in 1929, with tax money being transferred to two major local aristocratic landowning families for the land, sold at market rates. The amount paid was £91,291, 1s, 7d.

=== Select Committee Hearing ===
Here are notable extracts from the detailed minutes of evidence given before a Select Committee of the House of Lords in 1926:

Mr J Abady, Learned Counsel for Eastbourne Corporation, giving evidence: "The Corporation's desire, and I do not know that anybody questions it, is to preserve that beauty spot, to preserve it in its existing condition without being fenced in or ploughed up or built upon or dealt with in any way which would affect the general amenities. I do not think there is any question about that. The land in question consists of 4,100 acres. We want to ensure that the character of the land is preserved as it is at present."

Examination of the Mayor, Alderman Charles Knight, before the same Select Committee: "It is the deliberate intention of the Corporation, in promoting this clause, to secure the public the free and open use of the Downs in perpetuity?" The Mayor replied: "Absolutely."

== 2017 possible sale ==
In 2017, hundreds of concerned Eastbourne residents campaigned and marched for the continued public ownership of the Estate. Public pressure led to a policy change by Eastbourne Borough Council, cancelling the planned sale of the four farms within the estate.

=== Lobbying against the sale ===
On 30 January 2017, Dr Tony Whitbread, Chair of the South Downs Network, an "independent, voluntary network of conservation, environmental and community organisations with an interest in the South Downs", published an open letter on the Network's behalf, addressed to David Tutt of Eastbourne Borough Council:

"We... urge you to stop the proposed sale... comprising three-quarters of the Eastbourne Downland Estate. This land is an invaluable public asset for the people of Eastbourne, for the local area and visitors from further afield. It has great value for its rich natural capital, its biodiversity and cultural heritage, to public amenity and the town's drinking water supply. It is vital that ownership and management rest with... the democratic, publicly accountable local authority for Eastbourne... complying with the words and spirit of the 1926 Eastbourne Corporation Act. We strongly recommend that the Council rethinks its policy, looks more closely at the range of ecosystem services that the Eastbourne Downland generates and sets out a renewed vision for its Downs in harmony with its people. This should respect the fact that the land is held in trust by the Council on behalf of the people of Eastbourne. If you take this approach we will be more than happy to work with you, in partnership, to maximise the benefits from public land ownership; you can be assured that this would be a most popular move, applauded by the people of Eastbourne."

=== U-turn on sale of Estate farms ===
A new policy announcement was made at the start of March 2017, with the sale of the Downland Estate said to be "off the table".

=== Responses to March 2017 announcement ===
Margaret Paren, the Chair of the South Downs National Park Authority said on 7 March 2017: "We believe that this is a good decision for the farmers, for the environment, for the people of Eastbourne and for the National Park. The SDNPA will seek to work in partnership with... stakeholders to improve Eastbourne's gateway to the National Park and to create an internationally respected exemplar of chalk grassland restoration. This marks the beginning of an exciting new chapter for this precious downland."

Caroline Ansell MP said on 8 March 2017: "The argument around protection of the land had not been won and the consultation with local people was deeply flawed."

== Conservation projects and standards ==
=== Sites of Special Scientific Interest ===
There are several designated Sites of Special Scientific Interest within the Eastbourne Downland Estate. They include Willingdon Down, designated in 1986.

=== Drinking Water ===
The chalk aquifer underneath the Downland Estate is part of a larger natural water supply, that provides drinking water for 700,000 in the region. The Eastbourne Downland Estate falls into a government-designated Nitrate Vulnerable Zone.

=== National Park ===
On 12 November 2009, the South Downs National Park was created, including the Eastbourne Downland Estate. The Park is managed by the South Downs National Park Authority.

=== Heritage Coast ===
The Countryside Commission (predecessor to Natural England), designated the coastal part of the Estate the country's first ever stretch of Heritage Coast. This designation is for coast that "is of particular natural beauty or importance and is managed to preserve this largely undeveloped beauty".

=== Area of Outstanding Natural Beauty ===
The Eastbourne Downland Estate was included in the Sussex Downs Area of Outstanding Natural Beauty (AONB), designated by the Countryside Commission on 22 June 1965.

=== Marine Conservation Zone ===
The area west of Beachy Head was designated as an inshore marine conservation zone on 21 November 2013, titled Beachy Head West.

There have been calls from wildlife groups, politicians and local fishermen to create a Beachy Head East zone. Natural England and the Joint Nature Conservation Committee has identified this area as being at high risk of damage and degradation due to the presence of sensitive habitats and species.

=== Plant Important Area ===
The Estate is home to several designated Plant Important Areas, in recognition of the variety and ecological value of plant life in the area. At a marine level, these include areas with rich populations of algae.

=== Countryside Stewardship Agreements ===
As part of the Rural Development Programme for England, which replaced the Countryside Stewardship Scheme in 2014, funds are transferred from central government to help maintain and improve the Estate.

=== Regionally Important Geomorphological Site ===
The Estate is also a Regionally Important Geological Site (RIGS), a designation given for its value to Earth Science and earth heritage.

== Archaeological sites ==
The estate contains 32 separately designated Scheduled Ancient Monuments (SAMs). The four farms contain a large proportion of those SAMs including the most important of all: the Combe Hill Neolithic Causewayed Camp, as well as the much-researched Bullock Down prehistoric field system, the Eastdean Down field system, and many prehistoric burial barrows.

=== Neolithic era ===
Remains of flint flakes, hand tools and metal making have been found and studied on the areas now known as Bullock Down and Cornish Farms. Flints were selected to make Neolithic axes between 8500 and 4000BCE. There was a flint mine on Wilmington Hill.

There are three 'settlement' sites and a causewayed enclosure at Combe Hill (identified by Musson in 1950). Most of the sites are artefacts find-spots and although one cremation site (Drewett 1982) and two inhumations (Ray 1909) are recorded.

=== Roman era: Beachy Head Lady ===
A skeleton was discovered during archaeological work in 1953. It has been dated as belonging to a person who lived in the Roman era, in approximately 245 AD. During a 2014 heritage project, it was further discovered that the skeleton had genetic heritage from sub-Saharan Africa. Jo Seaman, heritage officer at Eastbourne Borough Council was quoted as reporting: "We know this lady was around 30 years old [when she died], grew up in the vicinity of what is now East Sussex, ate a good diet of fish and vegetables, her bones were without disease and her teeth were in good condition."

== Management ==
As of 2016, the management of the Eastbourne Downland Estate is the overall responsibility of Eastbourne Borough Council. The Council delegate day-to-day responsibility to Strutt & Parker (part of Christie's group), who act as land management agents, and to the four working farmers for various processes of land management work.

=== The Downland Management Plan and the Eastbourne Downland Forum ===
Eastbourne Borough Council publish an Eastbourne Downland Management Plan periodically, intended as a summary of goals and strategies for land management of the Estate.

According to the Eastbourne Downland Management Plan 2015–22, Appendix A, authored by Eastbourne Borough Council on 8 May 2015, the management of the Estate is also "influenced" by the Eastbourne Downland Forum. The Forum was created in the 1990s, as a means for stakeholders to meet and advise on management of the Estate.

Neither minutes of its meetings, nor records of those in attendance, are published. There is no record of the Eastbourne Downland Forum influencing the Downland management, or even issuing a recommendation or guidance.

=== Downland Ranger Service ===
For most of the 20th Century frontline Estate management was delegated to a Downland Ranger Service.

British Pathé News filmed the Downland Ranger for an international newsreel in 1949. In the item, Constable Henry Poole and his horse Thomas are shown to leave a stable at a Downs Police Station operated by Eastbourne County Borough Police. He is depicted later, variously: warning children not to sit on the edge of cliffs at Beachy Head; rounding up cattle; saving the lives of a ewe and a pigeon; putting out a small fire; receiving a note from a shepherd.

In the late 1990s, "practical management of the land [was] carried out by the Council's Downland Ranger Service and by various contractors who [were] supervised by the Ranger Service. The Council also [had] an Arboriculturist Officer to supervise the management of the 250 acres of deciduous woodland mostly on the Eastbourne Downland eastern escarpment."

The Downland Ranger Service was closed in 2008 by Eastbourne Borough Council. The Council argued that the South Downs National Park Authority would serve as a replacement. The Authority was not founded until 2009 and replacement Eastbourne Downland Ranger posts were not created, as of 2016.
