= 2015 Eastbourne Borough Council election =

2015 UK local government election

Results of the 2015 Eastbourne Borough Council election

The 2015 Eastbourne Borough Council election took place on 7 May 2015 to elect members of Eastbourne Borough Council in England. This was on the same day as other local elections and the general election. Overall turnout was 65.55% or 49,227

== Result ==
Eastbourne local election result 2015
Party	Seats	Gains	Losses	Net gain/loss	Seats %	Votes %	Votes	+/−
Liberal Democrats	18	3	0	+3	66.7	38.6	18,688	-3.9
Conservative	9	0	3	-3	33.3	32.6	15,879	-7.8
UKIP	0	0	0	0	0.0	14.3	7,972	+14.0
Labour	0	0	0	0	0.0	10.9	5,326	-0.3
Green	0	0	0	0	0.0	3.4	4,379	-2.3
Independent	0	0	0	0	0.0	0.3	367	+0.2

== Ward results ==
Devonshire (3 seats)
Party	Candidate	Votes	%	±%
Liberal Democrats	Margaret Bannister	2,287	44.8	
Liberal Democrats	Steve Wallis	2,022	39.6	
Liberal Democrats	Steve Holt	1,920	37.6	
Conservative	Simon Herbert	861	16.9	
Labour	Angela Bennett	855	16.7	
Conservative	Steve Hobbs	831	16.3	
UKIP	David Greenwood	798	15.6	
Labour	Dave Brinson	776	15.2	
Conservative	James Hopkins	736	14.4	
UKIP	Colin Horscroft	688	13.5	
UKIP	Bob Lacey	647	12.7	
Labour	Gerry Stonestreet	584	11.4	
Green	Alex Lea	531	10.4	
Independent	Keith Gell	129	2.5	
Turnout		5106	56.2	
Liberal Democrats hold		Swing		
Liberal Democrats hold		Swing		
Liberal Democrats hold		Swing		

Hampden Park (3 seats)
Party	Candidate	Votes	%	±%
Liberal Democrats	Pat Hearn	1,921	38.2	−11.4
Liberal Democrats	Jim Murray	1,635		
Liberal Democrats	Colin Swansborough	1,546		
Conservative	Simon Howe	954	19.0	−5.6
UKIP	Paul Brown	887	17.6	n/a
UKIP	Barry Wright	828		
Conservative	Tom Liddiard	790		
Conservative	Matthew Ireland	772		
Labour	Eleanor Lambert	626	12.4	−4.3
Labour	Helen Key	551		
Labour	Douglas Skelly	532		
Green	Ivor Hueting	407	8.1	−1.0
Independent	David Poole	238	4.7	n/a
Turnout				
Liberal Democrats hold		Swing		
Liberal Democrats hold		Swing		
Liberal Democrats hold		Swing		

Langney (3 seats)
Party	Candidate	Votes	%	±%
Liberal Democrats	Alan Shuttleworth	2,389	47.3	−5.7
Liberal Democrats	Troy Tester	1,929		
Liberal Democrats	Harun Miah	1,920		
Conservative	Gloria Barker	1,032	20.4	−6.4
Conservative	Paul Gosling	962		
Conservative	Alex Richards	961		
UKIP	Ian Garbutt	930	18.4	n/a
UKIP	Christopher Holloway	848		
Labour	Lee Comfort	441	8.7	−1.6
Labour	Martin Howie	373		
Labour	Roy Noble	336		
Green	Pippa Oliphant	260	5.1	−4.9
Turnout				
Liberal Democrats hold		Swing		
Liberal Democrats hold		Swing		
Liberal Democrats hold		Swing		

Meads (3 seats)
Party	Candidate	Votes	%	±%
Conservative	Robert Smart	2,573	42.4	−10.1
Conservative	Barry Taylor	2,416		
Conservative	Kathy Smethers	2,347		
Liberal Democrats	Andrew Callaghan	1,399	23.0	+4.3
Liberal Democrats	Rebecca Madell	1,372		
Liberal Democrats	Jean Fisher	1,186		
UKIP	Michael Dean	803	13.2	+3.7
Green	Sally Boys	713	11.7	+2.2
UKIP	Alan Thornton	642		
UKIP	William Smith	626		
Labour	Lucette Davies	582	9.6	+−0.0
Labour	Lisa Gillette	545		
Labour	Dennis Scard	519		
Turnout				
Conservative hold		Swing		
Conservative hold		Swing		
Conservative hold		Swing		

Old Town (3 seats)
Party	Candidate	Votes	%	±%
Liberal Democrats	Janet Coles	2,613	37.1	−9.6
Liberal Democrats	John Ungar	2,514		
Liberal Democrats	Jonathan Dow	2,273		
Conservative	Anne Angel	2,241	31.8	−1.3
Conservative	Graham Buchanan	1,830		
Conservative	Vivienne De Havilland-Geraghty	1,492		
Green	Rob Clarke	898	12.7	+0.6
UKIP	Robert Harper	680	9.7	n/a
Labour	Paul Richards	612	8.7	+0.7
Labour	Jean Couture	530		
Labour	Sharon Wentworth	477		
Turnout				
Liberal Democrats hold		Swing		
Liberal Democrats hold		Swing		
Liberal Democrats hold		Swing		

Ratton (3 seats)
Party	Candidate	Votes	%	±%
Conservative	Colin Belsey	2,441	42.3	
Conservative	Colin Murdoch	2,011	34.8	
Conservative	Tony Freebody	1,904	33.0	
Liberal Democrats	Linda Beckmann	1,628	28.2	
Liberal Democrats	Roger Howarth	1,448	25.1	
Liberal Democrats	Daniel Neilson	1,370	23.7	
UKIP	David Alfred	924	16.0	
UKIP	Brian McIntyre	866	15.0	
UKIP	Helen Hill	807	14.0	
Labour	John Lambert	640	11.1	
Labour	Anne Grigg	466	8.1	
Labour	John Wentworth	380	6.6	
Green	John Oliphant	356	6.2	
Turnout		5775	73.3	
Conservative hold		Swing		
Conservative hold		Swing		
Conservative hold		Swing		

St Anthony's (3 seats)
Party	Candidate	Votes	%	±%
Liberal Democrats	David Tutt	2,658	45.3	−13.6
Liberal Democrats	Gill Mattock	2,272		
Liberal Democrats	Dean Sabri	2,081		
Conservative	Nick Ansell	1,465	24.9	+1.9
Conservative	Danielle Perry	1,032		
Conservative	Robert Findon	1,008		
UKIP	Terence Grant	928	15.8	n/a
UKIP	Jayne Palmer	849		
UKIP	Amanda Sheehan	773		
Labour	Jackie Ferguson	498	8.5	−1.9
Labour	Alan Battrum	478		
Labour	Ian Culshaw	418		
Green	Hugh Norris	325	5.5	−2.3
Turnout				
Liberal Democrats hold		Swing		
Liberal Democrats hold		Swing		
Liberal Democrats hold		Swing		

Sovereign (3 seats)
Party	Candidate	Votes	%	±%
Conservative	Raymond Blakeborough	2,707	40.9	−7.4
Conservative	Penny di Cara	2,366		
Conservative	Gordon Jenkins	2,219		
Liberal Democrats	Barbara Leggett	1,684	25.4	−4.8
UKIP	Nicola Burton	1,395	21.1	n/a
Liberal Democrats	Nick Maskelyne	1,360		
Liberal Democrats	Anthony Somers	1,287		
UKIP	Paul Keeble	1,081		
UKIP	Jean Spencer	984		
Labour	Richard Goude	514	7.8	−1.3
Labour	Samantha Lyster	463		
Labour	Sarah Richards	437		
Green	Robert Sier	321	4.8	−7.6
Turnout				
Conservative hold		Swing		
Conservative hold		Swing		
Conservative hold		Swing		

Upperton (3 seats)
Party	Candidate	Votes	%	±%
Liberal Democrats	Pat Rodohan	2,109	38.4	+2.3
Liberal Democrats	Sammy Choudhury	1,900		
Liberal Democrats	Margaret Salsbury	1,831		
Conservative	Annabelle West	1,605	29.3	−15.5
Conservative	Adrian Platt	1,562		
Conservative	Diane Mulkeirins	1,529		
UKIP	Charlotte Clifford	627	11.4	n/a
Green	Alex Hough	588	10.7	−0.3
UKIP	Clive Jennings	583		
Labour	Elizabeth Goude	558	10.2	+2.1
Labour	Matthew Quanstrom	513		
UKIP	Rita Rolt	503		
Labour	Simon Miller	498		
Turnout				
Liberal Democrats gain from Conservative		Swing		
Liberal Democrats gain from Conservative		Swing		
Liberal Democrats gain from Conservative		Swing		

== By-elections between 2015 and 2019 ==
Sovereign by-election 24 November 2016
Party	Candidate	Votes	%	±%
Conservative	Paul Metcalfe	1,276	65.2	+24.3
Liberal Democrats	Roger Howarth	528	27.0	+1.6
Labour	Louis Thorburn	152	7.8	+0.0
Majority		748	38.2	
Turnout		1,956		
Conservative hold		Swing		
