= 2011 Eastbourne Borough Council election =

2011 UK local government election

Map of the results of the 2011 Eastbourne Borough Council election. Liberal Democrats in yellow and Conservatives in blue.

The 2011 Eastbourne Borough Council election took place on 5 May 2011 to elect members of Eastbourne Borough Council in East Sussex, England. The whole council was up for election and the Liberal Democrats stayed in overall control of the council.

== Background ==
Before the election the Liberal Democrats controlled the council with 20 seats, compared to 7 for the Conservatives, after taking control at the 2007 election. A total of 94 candidates stood for the 27 seats on the council being contested, while 10 sitting councillors stood down at the election, 8 Liberal Democrats and 2 Conservatives. Important seats for control of the council were expected to be Old Town and Sovereign, as well as Hampden Park and Upperton.

Local issues at the election included plans for the redevelopment of the town centre, which was supported across parties, and calls to improve Eastbourne's transport links. However, with the Liberal Democrats in government nationally together with the Conservatives, national government decisions, such as the increase in tuition fees, were also an issue during the election.

== Election result ==
The Liberal Democrats remained in control of the council with 15 seats, but lost 5 seats to the Conservatives. The Conservatives gained all 3 seats in Sovereign ward and also took the 2 seats the Liberal Democrats had been defending in Upperton. This took the Conservatives to 12 councillors, but the Liberal Democrats held on to all 3 seats in Old Town ward after a recount, to keep a 3-seat council majority. Overall turnout at the election was 44.17%, compared to 42.26% in 2007.

Eastbourne local election result 2011
Party	Seats	Gains	Losses	Net gain/loss	Seats %	Votes %	Votes	+/−
Liberal Democrats	15	0	5	-5	55.6	39.4	13,341	-5.6
Conservative	12	5	0	+5	44.4	38.0	12,893	-0.5
Green	0	0	0	0	0.0	10.6	3,590	+1.7
Labour	0	0	0	0	0.0	10.4	3,515	+5.2
UKIP	0	0	0	0	0.0	1.2	404	-1.2
Independent	0	0	0	0	0.0	0.5	160	N/A

== Ward results ==
Devonshire (3 seats)
Party	Candidate	Votes	%	±%
Liberal Democrats	Margaret Bannister	1,529		
Liberal Democrats	Neil Stanley	1,304		
Liberal Democrats	Steve Wallis	1,273		
Conservative	Margaret Parker	672		
Conservative	Sandra Elkin	666		
Conservative	Grant Sanders	580		
Labour	Steven Clark	412		
Labour	Richard Goude	345		
Labour	Jean Winstone	337		
Green	Linda Wintle	295		
Green	Bill Palethorpe	256		
Independent	Keith Gell	160		
Turnout		7,829	34.5	+0.0
Liberal Democrats hold		Swing		
Liberal Democrats hold		Swing		
Liberal Democrats hold		Swing		

Hampden Park (3 seats)
Party	Candidate	Votes	%	±%
Liberal Democrats	Pat Hearn	1,394		
Liberal Democrats	Jim Murray	1,266		
Liberal Democrats	Mike Thompson	1,225		
Conservative	Caroline Ansell	692		
Conservative	Kate Glover	672		
Conservative	Sam Chapman	643		
Labour	Dave Brinson	470		
Labour	Jake Lambert	418		
Labour	Gerry Stonestreet	344		
Green	Leslie Dalton	255		
Green	Ivor Hueting	220		
Green	Rob Sier	166		
Turnout		7,765	40.1	+8.2
Liberal Democrats hold		Swing		
Liberal Democrats hold		Swing		
Liberal Democrats hold		Swing		

Langney (3 seats)
Party	Candidate	Votes	%	±%
Liberal Democrats	Alan Shuttleworth	1,434		
Liberal Democrats	Harun Miah	1,328		
Liberal Democrats	Troy Tester	1,282		
Conservative	Tony Freebody	726		
Conservative	John Glover	720		
Conservative	Jan Jenkins	705		
Labour	Lee Comfort	278		
Green	Christine Quarrington	270		
Labour	Sean Meekings	258		
Labour	Roy Noble	218		
Turnout		7,219	34.4	+0.4
Liberal Democrats hold		Swing		
Liberal Democrats hold		Swing		
Liberal Democrats hold		Swing		

Meads (3 seats)
Party	Candidate	Votes	%	±%
Conservative	Barry Taylor	2,239		
Conservative	David Elkin	2,232		
Conservative	Nigel Goodyear	2,126		
Liberal Democrats	Tom Banner	797		
Liberal Democrats	Jean Fisher	766		
Liberal Democrats	Margaret Ticehurst	734		
Green	Harry Boys	414		
Labour	Jean Couture	411		
UKIP	Ian Cameron	404		
Labour	Dennis Scard	373		
Green	Dorothy Forsyth	361		
Labour	Manek Jaffer	349		
Turnout		11,206	51.4	+3.5
Conservative hold		Swing		
Conservative hold		Swing		
Conservative hold		Swing		

Old Town (3 seats)
Party	Candidate	Votes	%	±%
Liberal Democrats	Carolyn Heaps	2,432		
Liberal Democrats	Janet Coles	1,934		
Liberal Democrats	John Ungar	1,738		
Conservative	Anne Angel	1,726		
Conservative	Vivienne De Havilland-Geraghty	1,350		
Conservative	Danielle Perry	1,193		
Green	Pippa Oliphant	631		
Labour	Helen Key	418		
Labour	Paul Richards	374		
Labour	Sarah Richards	340		
Turnout		12,136	53.4	−1.4
Liberal Democrats hold		Swing		
Liberal Democrats hold		Swing		
Liberal Democrats hold		Swing		

Ratton (3 seats)
Party	Candidate	Votes	%	±%
Conservative	Colin Belsey	2,357	57.0	
Conservative	Sandie Howlett	2,076	50.2	
Conservative	Colin Murdoch	1,991	48.1	
Liberal Democrats	Linda Beckmann	999	24.1	
Liberal Democrats	Roger Howarth	984	23.8	
Liberal Democrats	Barbara Rodohan	908	21.9	
Green	Nancy Dalton	523	12.6	
Labour	Christopher Hall	471	11.4	
Labour	James Nolan	394	9.5	
Labour	Helen Sedgwick	360	8.7	
Turnout		4,138	53.1	+4.8
Conservative hold		Swing		
Conservative hold		Swing		
Conservative hold		Swing		

St Anthony's (3 seats)
Party	Candidate	Votes	%	±%
Liberal Democrats	David Tutt	2,169		
Liberal Democrats	Jon Harris	1,929		
Liberal Democrats	Gill Mattock	1,913		
Conservative	Nick Ansell	846		
Conservative	Simon Herbert	759		
Conservative	Robert Borland	752		
Labour	Jackie Ferguson	383		
Labour	David Salmon	348		
Labour	Ian Culshaw	332		
Green	Hugh Norris	287		
Turnout		9,718	43.8	+2.5
Liberal Democrats hold		Swing		
Liberal Democrats hold		Swing		
Liberal Democrats hold		Swing		

Sovereign (3 seats)
Party	Candidate	Votes	%	±%
Conservative	Philip Ede	1,904		
Conservative	Patrick Warner	1,767		
Conservative	Gordon Jenkins	1,745		
Liberal Democrats	Margaret Salsbury	1,193		
Liberal Democrats	Stephen Holt	1,169		
Liberal Democrats	Grace Loseby	1,106		
Green	Jocelyn McCarthy	488		
Labour	Sharon Wentworth	359		
Turnout		9,731	40.6	+1.6
Conservative gain from Liberal Democrats		Swing		
Conservative gain from Liberal Democrats		Swing		
Conservative gain from Liberal Democrats		Swing		

Upperton (3 seats)
Party	Candidate	Votes	%	±%
Conservative	Tom Liddiard	1,731		
Conservative	Annabelle West	1,707		
Conservative	Alun Cooke	1,694		
Liberal Democrats	Alex Hough	1,394		
Liberal Democrats	Pat Rodohan	1,378		
Liberal Democrats	Hilary Lewis	1,324		
Green	Kenneth Webb	427		
Labour	Margaret Barr	313		
Labour	Lucette Davies	305		
Labour	Elizabeth Goude	304		
Turnout		10,577	46.4	+0.1
Conservative hold		Swing		
Conservative gain from Liberal Democrats		Swing		
Conservative gain from Liberal Democrats		Swing		

== By-elections between 2011 and 2015 ==
A by-election was held in Meads on 31 May 2012 after the resignation of Conservative councillor Nigel Goodyear. The seat was held for the Conservatives by Caroline Ansell with a majority of 1,318 votes over Liberal Democrat Gerard Thompson.

Meads by-election 31 May 2012
Party	Candidate	Votes	%	±%
Conservative	Caroline Ansell	1,783	59.6	+7.1
Liberal Democrats	Gerard Thompson	465	15.5	−3.2
Labour	Dennis Scard	323	10.8	+1.2
UKIP	Ian Cameron	322	10.8	+1.3
Independent	Keith Gell	100	3.3	+3.3
Majority		1,318	44.1	
Turnout		2,993	39	−12
Conservative hold		Swing		
