= 2019 Eastbourne Borough Council election =

2019 UK local government election

2019 Eastbourne Borough Council Election
- May 2, 2019

All 27 Council Seats
	First party	Second party	Third party
Leader	David Tutt	Tony Freebody	Jake Lambert
Party	Liberal Democrats	Conservative	Labour
Last election	18 seats 66.6%	9 seats 33.3%	0 Seats, 0%
Seats won	18 seats 66.6%	9 seats 33.3%	0 Seats 0%
Seat change	Steady	Steady	Steady
Popular vote	36,604	24,396	7,909
Percentage	49.6%	33.1%	10.7%
Swing	▲14.1%	▲2.9%	▲0.6%
- Results by ward
Council Control before election
{{{before_election}}}
Liberal Democrats
Subsequent Council Control
Liberal Democrats

The 2019 Eastbourne District Council election took place on 2 May 2019 to elect members of Eastbourne Borough Council in England. This was on the same day as other local elections. All 27 members of the council were elected over 9 3 member wards.

The Liberal Democrats maintained majority control of the Council.

== Summary ==
=== Election result ===
2019 Eastbourne Borough Council election
Party	Candidates	Seats	Gains	Losses	Net gain/loss	Seats %	Votes %	Votes	+/−
Liberal Democrats	27	18	0	0	Steady	66.7	49.6	36,604	+14.1
Conservative	27	9	0	0	Steady	33.3	33.1	24,396	+2.9
Labour	23	0	0	0	Steady	0.0	10.7	7,909	+0.6
Green	4	0	0	0	Steady	0.0	3.6	2,637	–4.7
UKIP	5	0	0	0	Steady	0.0	2.3	1,715	–12.9
Independent	1	0	0	0	Steady	0.0	0.4	299	–0.3
SDP	1	0	0	0	Steady	0.0	0.3	199	New

== Ward results ==
A * denotes an incumbent councillor seeking re-election.

=== Devonshire ===
Devonshire (3 seats)
Party	Candidate	Votes	%	±%
Liberal Democrats	Margaret Bannister*	1,637	56.7	
Liberal Democrats	Steve Holt*	1,521	52.7	
Liberal Democrats	Steven Wallis*	1,472	51.0	
Labour	Helen Owen	541	18.7	
Conservative	Vivienne Dehavilland-Geraghty	455	15.7	
Labour	Louis Thorburn	450	15.6	
Conservative	Daniel Evans	433	15.0	
Conservative	Danielle Perry	426	14.8	
Green	Linda Wintle	425	14.7	
Labour	Geri Rolfe	423	14.6	
Rejected ballots		60	2.04	
Turnout		2,888	29.81	−26.39
Registered electors		9,688		
Liberal Democrats hold		Swing		
Liberal Democrats hold		Swing		
Liberal Democrats hold		Swing		

=== Hampden Park ===
Hampden Park (3 seats)
Party	Candidate	Votes	%	±%
Liberal Democrats	James Murray*	1,315	57.6	
Liberal Democrats	Colin Swansborough*	1,250	54.8	
Liberal Democrats	Dean Sabri	1,133	49.6	
Conservative	Mark Aukett	490	21.5	
Conservative	Brian Liddiard	450	19.7	
Labour	Wendy Lambert	448	19.6	
Labour	Graham Dean	443	19.4	
Labour	Margaret Robinson	389	17.0	
Conservative	Peter Lutterer	373	16.3	
Rejected ballots		49	2.10	
Turnout		2,283	29.30	
Registered electors		7,791		
Liberal Democrats hold		Swing		
Liberal Democrats hold		Swing		
Liberal Democrats hold		Swing		

=== Langney ===
Langney (3 seats)
Party	Candidate	Votes	%	±%
Liberal Democrats	Alan Shuttleworth*	1,607	67.4	
Liberal Democrats	Harun Miah*	1,333	56.0	
Liberal Democrats	Candy Vaughan	1,333	56.0	
Conservative	Sandra Elkin	363	15.2	
Conservative	Antony Hatton	352	14.8	
UKIP	Ian Garbutt	344	14.4	
Conservative	Sandie Howlett	342	14.4	
UKIP	Michael Mason	317	13.3	
Labour	Lee Comfort	225	9.4	
Labour	Julie Hart	212	8.9	
Labour	Roy Noble	165	6.9	
Rejected ballots		18	0.75	
Turnout		2,383	30.21	
Registered electors		7,887		
Liberal Democrats hold		Swing		
Liberal Democrats hold		Swing		
Liberal Democrats hold		Swing		

=== Meads ===
Meads (3 seats)
Party	Candidate	Votes	%	±%
Conservative	Robert Smart	1,702	44.9	
Conservative	Barry Taylor*	1,687	44.5	
Conservative	Jane Lamb	1,671	44.1	
Liberal Democrats	Peter Durrant	1,162	30.7	
Liberal Democrats	Ruth Lintott	1,118	29.5	
Liberal Democrats	Debra Sabri	1,002	26.4	
Green	Dorothy Forsyth	795	21.0	
Labour	Janee Sa	467	12.3	
UKIP	Christopher Holloway	418	11.0	
Rejected ballots		28	0.73	
Turnout		3,791	44.44	
Registered electors		8,530		
Conservative hold		Swing		
Conservative hold		Swing		
Conservative hold		Swing		

=== Old Town ===
Old Town (3 seats)
Party	Candidate	Votes	%	±%
Liberal Democrats	Jonathan Dow*	1,962	51.9	
Liberal Democrats	Peter Diplock	1,910	50.6	
Liberal Democrats	Amanda Morris	1,566	41.5	
Conservative	Nicholas Ansell	1,022	27.1	
Conservative	Robert Findon	865	22.9	
Conservative	Mozmil Hussain	816	21.6	
Green	Jo Henderson	757	20.0	
Labour	Jake Lambert	597	15.8	
Labour	Sarah Richards	349	9.2	
Labour	Rue Franklin	331	8.8	
SDP	Sally Kitchen	199	5.3	
Rejected ballots		33	0.87	
Turnout		3,778	45.53	
Registered electors		8,297		
Liberal Democrats hold		Swing		
Liberal Democrats hold		Swing		
Liberal Democrats hold		Swing		

=== Ratton ===
Ratton (3 seats)
Party	Candidate	Votes	%	±%
Conservative	Colin Belsey*	1,516	49.9	
Conservative	Tony Freebody*	1,373	45.2	
Conservative	Colin Murdoch*	1,356	44.6	
Liberal Democrats	Rebecca Madell	1,167	38.4	
Liberal Democrats	Hugh Parker	1,023	33.7	
Liberal Democrats	Blash Rassekh Ghaemmaghani	983	32.6	
Labour	Jill Shacklock	303	10.0	
Labour	John Lambert	283	9.3	
Labour	David Bishop	270	8.9	
Rejected ballots		71	2.28	
Turnout		3038	40.42	−32.88
Registered electors		7,517		
Conservative hold		Swing		
Conservative hold		Swing		
Conservative hold		Swing		

=== St Anthony's ===
St Anthony's (3 seats)
Party	Candidate	Votes	%	±%
Liberal Democrats	David Tutt*	1,604	56.7	
Liberal Democrats	Rebecca Whippy	1,469	51.9	
Liberal Democrats	Helen Burton	1,257	44.4	
Conservative	Anne Angel	547	19.3	
Conservative	Donald Cornwall	489	17.3	
Conservative	Richard Davis	484	17.1	
UKIP	Colin Horscroft	316	11.2	
Independent	Stephen Halbhuber	299	10.6	
Labour	Rachael Norris	292	10.3	
Labour	Dave Brinson	275	9.7	
Labour	Phil Mills	217	7.7	
Rejected ballots		15	0.53	
Turnout		2830	33.26	
Registered electors		8,509		
Liberal Democrats hold		Swing		
Liberal Democrats hold		Swing		
Liberal Democrats hold		Swing		

=== Sovereign ===
Sovereign (3 seats)
Party	Candidate	Votes	%	±%
Conservative	Caroline Ansell	1,749	56.0	
Conservative	Paul Metcalfe	1,613	51.6	
Conservative	Penelope di Cara*	1,551	49.6	
Liberal Democrats	Sam Browne	1,035	33.1	
Liberal Democrats	David Edwards	982	31.4	
Liberal Democrats	James Prime	928	29.7	
Labour	Ian Culshaw	284	9.1	
Labour	Farol Pernet	241	7.7	
Rejected ballots		75	2.34	
Turnout		3,124	33.37	
Registered electors		9,363		
Conservative hold		Swing		
Conservative hold		Swing		
Conservative hold		Swing		

=== Upperton ===
Upperton (3 seats)
Party	Candidate	Votes	%	±%
Liberal Democrats	Sammy Choudhury*	1,701	52.5	
Liberal Democrats	Pat Rodohan*	1,638	50.5	
Liberal Democrats	Robin Maxted	1,496	46.1	
Conservative	Nicholas Henderson	775	23.9	
Conservative	Tom Liddiard	755	23.3	
Conservative	Darryl Gosling	741	22.8	
Green	Alexandra Hough	660	20.4	
Labour	Gill Poole	398	12.3	
UKIP	Amanda Sheehan	320	9.9	
Labour	Paul Richards	306	9.4	
Rejected ballots		22	0.67	
Turnout		3,243	39.20	
Registered electors		8,274		
Liberal Democrats hold		Swing		
Liberal Democrats hold		Swing		
Liberal Democrats hold		Swing		

== Changes 2019–2023 ==
=== By-elections ===
==== Hampden Park ====
The by-election was triggered by the resignation of Liberal Democrat councillor Dean Sabri, who stood down after taking up a role that required political neutrality.

Hampden Park, 6 May 2021
Party	Candidate	Votes	%	±%
Liberal Democrats	Josh Babarinde	1,080	45.9	−4.8
Conservative	Luke Borland	857	36.4	+14.5
Labour	Margaret Robinson	418	17.7	+0.3
Majority		223	9.5	
Rejected ballots		26	1.09	
Turnout		2,355		
Liberal Democrats hold		Swing		

==== Sovereign ====
The by-election was triggered by the resignation of Conservative councillor Caroline Ansell, the Eastbourne and Willingdon MP, who stood down to focus on her parliamentary workload as the House of Commons resumed in-person sittings after the COVID-19 lockdown.

Sovereign, 6 May 2021
Party	Candidate	Votes	%	±%
Conservative	Kshama Shore	1,996	56.4	−1.0
Liberal Democrats	Kathy Ballard	1,160	32.8	−1.1
Labour	Louis Thorburn	257	7.3	−2.0
UKIP	Ian Garbutt	124	3.5	New
Majority		836	23.6	
Rejected ballots		22	0.62	
Turnout		3,537		
Conservative hold		Swing		

==== St Anthony's ====
The by-election was triggered by the resignation of Liberal Democrat councillor Helen Burton, who cited health issues, family circumstances and a planned move to Somerset.

St Anthony's: 6 October 2022
Party	Candidate	Votes	%	±%
Liberal Democrats	Hugh Wayne Parker	972	49.6	−2.9
Conservative	Nicholas John Raymond Ansell	513	26.2	+8.3
Green	Rachael Dawn Norris	420	21.4	New
UKIP	Ian Charles Garbutt	55	2.8	−7.5
Majority		459	23.4	
Rejected ballots		4	0.20	
Turnout		1,960	23.04	
Liberal Democrats hold		Swing	▼5.6	
