= 1973 Eastbourne Borough Council election =

1973 UK local government election

The first elections to the new local authorities established by the Local Government Act 1972 in England and Wales and the new Northern Ireland district councils created by the Local Government Act (Northern Ireland) 1972 took place in 1973. The whole of Eastbourne Borough Council was up for election.

== Borough result ==
It was a good result for the Liberal party. They won 19 of the 33 seats, giving them an overall majority of 5. The Liberals took control on 1 April 1974 of the new non-metropolitan district as a consequence. The Conservatives became the official opposition after winning 10 seats. Labour won 4 seats.

== Ward results ==
Member of the old borough council denoted by *

=== Cavendish ===
Cavendish (3)
Party	Candidate	Votes	%	±%
Liberal	T W Ward*	1,290	54.2	
Liberal	E D Ward*	1,165		
Liberal	Leslie Jack Leach	1,108		
Labour	Percy George Wood*	522	21.9	
Conservative	J Macdonald	487	20.5	
Labour	J Cross	482		
Conservative	L Staples	431		
Conservative	M Lowton	425		
Labour	G Watson	415		
Independent	R Armstrong	81	3.4	
Majority			32.3	
Turnout			55.4	
Liberal win (new seat)				

=== Central ===
Central (3)
Party	Candidate	Votes	%	±%
Liberal	A A Maryan	1,047	56.5	
Liberal	Charles George Piper	986		
Liberal	S G Ward	973		
Conservative	M E Tunwell	806	43.5	
Conservative	Reginald Poynter*	800		
Conservative	Neil Fergus Nicholson*	800		
Majority			13.0	
Turnout			45.9	
Liberal win (new seat)				

=== Devonshire ===
Devonshire (3)
Party	Candidate	Votes	%	±%
Liberal	J Healey	969	46.8	
Conservative	Charles Edward Dobell*	949	45.8	
Liberal	Anthony L Boswall	936		
Liberal	W Creffield	920		
Conservative	Eric Hugh Bowdler*	905		
Conservative	D Charlton	883		
Labour	J Howse	152	7.3	
Majority			1.0	
Turnout			46.0	
Liberal win (new seat)				

=== Downside ===
Downside (3)
Party	Candidate	Votes	%	±%
Liberal	Maurice Skilton*	1,547	59.2	
Liberal	E M Edwards*	1,410		
Liberal	H Goodchild	1,374		
Conservative	Joseph Angelman*	1,068	40.8	
Conservative	M Charlton	897		
Conservative	C Elsey	888		
Majority			18.3	
Turnout			59.0	
Liberal win (new seat)				

=== Hampden Park ===
Hampden Park (4)
Party	Candidate	Votes	%	±%
Liberal	Peter Francis Jackson*	1,903	48.9	
Liberal	Charles Henry Lacey*	1,768		
Liberal	L Mason	1,694		
Liberal	Douglas D Carn	1,650		
Labour	Roland James Hutchinson*	1,548	39.8	
Labour	George Alan Bosley*	1,492		
Labour	P Chantler	1,309		
Labour	L Elphick	1,291		
Conservative	C Young	440	11.3	
Conservative	J Tunwell	436		
Conservative	A Cumming	435		
Conservative	C Anscombe	407		
Majority			9.1	
Turnout			46.5	
Liberal win (new seat)				

=== Langney ===
Langney (4)
Party	Candidate	Votes	%	±%
Labour	Leonard James Caine*	1,745		
Labour	Frederick Charles Solly*	1,580		
Labour	Roland Arthur Baker	1,538		
Labour	D M Salmon	1,514		
Conservative	J E Anscombe	1,154		
Conservative	M Bare	1,109		
Conservative	I Greenfield	1,088		
Conservative	C Porter	1,079		
Liberal	J Thomas	842		
Majority				
Turnout				
Labour win (new seat)				

=== Meads ===
Meads (3)
Party	Candidate	Votes	%	±%
Conservative	Leslie Aubrey Vickers*	1,345		
Conservative	Kathleen Ethel Raven*	1,345		
Conservative	Percy Stanley Brockwell*	1,297		
Liberal	E Pettigrew	919		
Liberal	M Hanlon	880		
Liberal	R Rees	878		
Labour	I Harris	118		
Majority				
Turnout				
Conservative win (new seat)				

=== Ratton ===
Ratton (4)
Party	Candidate	Votes	%	±%
Liberal	R H Dingwall	1,802		
Conservative	Winifred Emily Ouzman*	1,746		
Conservative	Michael Scott Phipp*	1,698		
Conservative	D P Cullen	1,698		
Liberal	L Frere	1,650		
Liberal	W Charlton	1,636		
Conservative	J Toop	1,597		
Liberal	E French	1,575		
Labour	A Ticehurst	510		
Labour	K Booth	474		
Labour	D Evans	467		
Labour	P Sorrell	455		
Majority				
Turnout				
Conservative win (new seat)				

=== Roselands ===
Roselands (3)
Party	Candidate	Votes	%	±%
Liberal	Charles Vivian Horridge*	1,319		
Liberal	William John Evenden*	1,244		
Liberal	Clifford Grahame Scott*	1,228		
Conservative	J Riley	680		
Conservative	J C Wakeford	607		
Conservative	M White	589		
Labour	P Richardson	370		
Majority				
Turnout				
Liberal win (new seat)				

=== Upperton ===
Upperton (4)
Party	Candidate	Votes	%	±%
Conservative	Una Eagle Goldie Gardner*	1,414	62.4	
Conservative	Tony James Aukett*	1,359		
Conservative	Charles W Aldous	1,285		
Liberal	M Perrin	851	37.6	
Liberal	D Parsons	828		
Liberal	N Frere	740		
Majority			24.9	
Turnout			45.1	
Conservative win (new seat)				
