= 2023 Eastbourne Borough Council election =

2023 UK local government election

- 4 May 2023

All 27 seats to Eastbourne Borough Council 14 seats needed for a majority
	First party	Second party	Third party
Party	Liberal Democrats	Conservative	Independent
Last election	18 seats, 49.6%	9 seats, 33.1%	0 seats, 0.4%
Seats before	16	7	3
Seats won	19	8	0
Seat change	▲1	▼1	Steady
Popular vote	36,350	24,101	97
Percentage	50.7%	33.9%	0.1%
Swing	▲1.1%	▲0.8%	▼0.3%
- Winner of each seat at the 2023 Eastbourne Borough Council election.
Leader before election
David Tutt
Liberal Democrats
Leader after election
Stephen Holt
Liberal Democrats

The 2023 Eastbourne Borough Council election took place on 4 May 2023 to elect members of Eastbourne Borough Council in East Sussex, England. This was on the same day as other local elections.

The Liberal Democrats retained their majority on the council. Their leader prior to the election was David Tutt, who did not stand for re-election. At the subsequent annual council meeting on 24 May 2023, Stephen Holt was appointed the new leader of the council.

== Summary ==
=== Election result ===
2023 Eastbourne Borough Council election
Party	Candidates	Seats	Gains	Losses	Net gain/loss	Seats %	Votes %	Votes	+/−
Liberal Democrats	27	19	1	0	+1	70.4	50.7	36,350	▲1.1
Conservative	27	8	0	1	-1	29.6	33.9	24,101	▲0.8
Labour	24	0	0	0	0	0.0	8.5	6,045	▼2.2
Green	15	0	0	0	0	0.0	5.8	4.121	▲2.2
UKIP	3	0	0	0	0	0.0	0.4	341	▼1.9
Reform	2	0	0	0	0	0.0	0.4	340	New
Independent	1	0	0	0	0	0.0	0.1	97	▼0.3

== Candidates and Ward results ==
The Statement of Persons Nominated, which details the candidates standing in each ward, was released by Eastbourne Borough Council following the close of nominations on 5 April 2023.

=== Devonshire ===
Devonshire (3 seats)
Party	Candidate	Votes	%	±%
Liberal Democrats	Margaret Bannister*	1,409	52.0	▼4.7
Liberal Democrats	Christina Ewbank	1,248	46.1	▼4.9
Liberal Democrats	Stephen Holt*	1,233	45.5	▼7.2
Labour	Dave Brinson	631	23.3	▲4.6
Conservative	Fiona Mullen	565	20.9	▲5.2
Conservative	Anne McWilliams	529	19.5	▲4.5
Conservative	Tahrin Begum	505	18.6	▲3.8
Labour	John Lambert	503	18.6	▲3.0
Labour	Lyn Pemberton	451	16.6	▲2.0
Green	Theresa McGhee	333	12.3	▼2.4
UKIP	Nigel Harper	147	5.4	New
Majority		602	22.2	
Rejected ballots		8	0.29	
Turnout		2709	27.0	−2.81
Registered electors				
Liberal Democrats hold		Swing		
Liberal Democrats hold		Swing		
Liberal Democrats hold		Swing		

=== Hampden Park ===
Hampden Park (3 seats)
Party	Candidate	Votes	%	±%
Liberal Democrats	Colin Swansborough*	1,091	55.4	▲0.6
Liberal Democrats	Jim Murray*	1,037	52.6	▼5.0
Liberal Democrats	Teri Sayers-Cooper	1,004	51.0	▲1.4
Conservative	Luke Borland	448	22.7	▲1.2
Conservative	Peter Lutterer	411	20.9	▲4.6
Conservative	Brian Liddiard	408	20.7	▲1.0
Labour	Margaret Robinson	271	13.8	▼3.2
Labour	Wendy Lambert	264	13.4	▼6.2
Labour	Graham Dean	254	12.9	▼6.5
Green	Sue Dixon	215	10.9	New
Independent	Dave Poole	97	4.9	New
Majority		593	30.1	
Rejected ballots		9	0.45	
Turnout		1970	25.3	−4
Registered electors				
Liberal Democrats hold		Swing		
Liberal Democrats hold		Swing		
Liberal Democrats hold		Swing		

=== Langney ===
Langney (3 seats)
Party	Candidate	Votes	%	±%
Liberal Democrats	Alan Shuttleworth*	1,485	71.3	▲3.9
Liberal Democrats	Anita Mayes	1,358	65.2	▲9.2
Liberal Democrats	Candy Vaughan*	1,318	63.3	▲7.3
Conservative	Brian Stevens	372	17.9	▲2.7
Conservative	Lucy Wooler	354	17.0	▲2.2
Conservative	Radwan Hussain	310	14.9	▲0.5
Labour	Lee Comfort	175	8.4	▼1.0
Green	Sarah Hill	137	6.6	New
Labour	Roy Noble	132	6.3	▼0.6
Labour	Daniel Thomas	114	5.5	▼3.4
UKIP	Ian Garbutt	95	4.6	▼9.8
Majority		946	45.4	
Rejected ballots		3	0.14	
Turnout		2083	26.5	−3.71
Registered electors				
Liberal Democrats hold		Swing		
Liberal Democrats hold		Swing		
Liberal Democrats hold		Swing		

=== Meads ===
Meads (3 seats)
Party	Candidate	Votes	%	±%
Liberal Democrats	Andy Collins	1,630	42.5	▲11.8
Conservative	Jane Lamb*	1,585	41.4	▼2.7
Conservative	Robert Smart*	1,536	40.0	▼4.9
Liberal Democrats	Kirsteen Miller	1,515	39.5	▲10.0
Conservative	Nicholas Taylor	1,508	39.4	▼5.1
Liberal Democrats	John Hudson	1,457	38.0	▲11.6
Green	Alexandra Hough	297	7.8	▼13.2
Green	Claire Martin	247	6.4	▼14.6
Labour	David Mannion	211	5.5	▼6.8
Labour	Angela Goodchild	209	5.5	▼6.8
Reform	Keith Gell	184	4.8	New
Labour	Bill Filby	176	4.6	▼7.7
Reform	Kayaking Kris Mullens	156	4.1	New
Majority		28	0.7	
Rejected ballots		6	0.16	
Turnout		3,832	43.4	−1.04
Registered electors				
Liberal Democrats gain from Conservative		Swing		
Conservative hold		Swing		
Conservative hold		Swing		

=== Old Town ===
Old Town (3 seats)
Party	Candidate	Votes	%	±%
Liberal Democrats	Peter Diplock*	2,074	57.7	▲7.1
Liberal Democrats	Ali Dehdashty	1,939	53.9	▲3.3
Liberal Democrats	Amanda Morris*	1,913	53.2	▲11.7
Conservative	Jessica Gisby	817	22.7	▼4.4
Conservative	Vivienne De Havilland-Geraghty	767	21.3	▼1.6
Conservative	James Sneath	738	20.5	▲0.5
Labour Co-op	Jake Lambert	497	13.8	▼2.0
Green	Jo Henderson	421	11.7	▼8.3
Green	Pippa Oliphant	364	10.1	▼9.9
Green	Trevor Egglestone	339	9.4	▼11.6
Labour Co-op	Paul Richards	262	7.3	▼1.9
UKIP	Colin Horscroft	99	2.8	New
Majority		1096	30.5	
Rejected ballots		8	0.22	
Turnout		3596	42.7	−2.83
Registered electors				
Liberal Democrats hold		Swing		
Liberal Democrats hold		Swing		
Liberal Democrats hold		Swing		

=== Ratton ===
Ratton (3 seats)
Party	Candidate	Votes	%	±%
Conservative	Colin Belsey*	1,453	50.8	▲0.9
Conservative	Nick Ansell	1,438	50.2	▲5.0
Conservative	David Small	1,324	46.3	▲1.7
Liberal Democrats	Tom Banner	1,002	35.0	▼3.4
Liberal Democrats	Carolyn Heaps	992	34.6	▲0.9
Liberal Democrats	Brett Wright	862	30.1	▼2.5
Green	Jo Thorpe	338	11.8	New
Labour	David Godfrey	281	9.8	▼0.2
Labour	Jill Shacklock	242	8.5	▼0.8
Labour	Patrick Duffy	223	7.8	▼1.1
Majority		322	11.3	
Rejected ballots		12	0.42	
Turnout		2862	38.0	▼2.4
Registered electors				
Conservative hold		Swing		
Conservative hold		Swing		
Conservative hold		Swing		

=== St Anthony's ===
St Anthony's (3 seats)
Party	Candidate	Votes	%	±%
Liberal Democrats	Daniel Butcher	1,399	56.5	▼0.2
Liberal Democrats	Jenny Williams	1,395	56.3	▲4.4
Liberal Democrats	Hugh Parker	1,304	52.7	▲8.3
Conservative	Sandie Howlett	599	24.2	▲4.9
Conservative	Richard Davis	592	23.9	▲6.6
Conservative	Bradley Coleiro-Swain	570	23.0	▲5.9
Green	Rachael Norris	414	16.7	New
Green	Noah Rutter	307	12.4	New
Labour	John Sailing	269	10.9	▲0.6
Majority		705	28.5	
Rejected ballots		20	0.80	
Turnout		2476	28.8	−4.46
Registered electors				
Liberal Democrats hold		Swing		
Liberal Democrats hold		Swing		
Liberal Democrats hold		Swing		

=== Sovereign ===
Sovereign (3 seats)
Party	Candidate	Votes	%	±%
Conservative	Penny di Cara*	1,629	51.7	▲2.1
Conservative	Kshama Shore	1,511	48.0	▼8.0
Conservative	Nigel Goodyear	1,480	47.0	▼4.6
Liberal Democrats	Jonathan Ballard	996	31.6	▼1.5
Liberal Democrats	Matt Doherty	914	29.0	▼2.4
Liberal Democrats	Deidre Glasgow	874	27.8	▼1.9
Green	Susan Kerrison	386	12.3	New
Green	Sue Whall	323	10.3	New
Labour	Derek Bradley	321	10.2	▲1.1
Labour	Alexander Richards	289	9.2	▲1.5
Labour	Scott Murly-Cleves	270	8.6	▲0.9
Majority		566	18.0	
Rejected ballots		22	0.69	
Turnout		3149	32.8	−0.57
Registered electors				
Conservative hold		Swing		
Conservative hold		Swing		
Conservative hold		Swing		

=== Upperton ===
Upperton (3 seats)
Party	Candidate	Votes	%	±%
Liberal Democrats	Kathy Ballard	1,683	53.5	▲1.0
Liberal Democrats	Pat Rodohan*	1,633	51.9	▲1.4
Liberal Democrats	Robin Maxted*	1,585	50.4	▲4.3
Conservative	Anne Angel	929	29.5	▲6.2
Conservative	Nick Henderson	897	28.5	▲4.6
Conservative	Mozmil Hussain	826	26.2	▲3.4
Green	Justine Munson	354	11.2	▼9.2
Labour	Gabriel Beck	318	10.1	▼2.2
Green	Jaime Birdbrook	282	9.0	New
Labour	Ian Culshaw	247	7.8	▼1.6
Labour	Daniel Hill	212	6.7	New
Majority		688	21.9	
Rejected ballots		19	0.60	
Turnout		3147	36.8	−2.4
Registered electors				
Liberal Democrats hold		Swing		
Liberal Democrats hold		Swing		
Liberal Democrats hold		Swing		

== Changes 2023–2027 ==
=== By-elections ===
==== Langney ====
The by-election was triggered by the resignation of Liberal Democrat councillor Anita Mayes for health reasons, following a diagnosis of multiple sclerosis.

Langney, 1 May 2025
Party	Candidate	Votes	%	±%
Liberal Democrats	Kara Bishop	1,013	50.4	–15.2
Reform	Stephen Lorch	645	32.1	N/A
Conservative	Rosie Moon	246	12.2	–4.2
Labour	Lee Comfort	55	2.7	–5.0
Independent	Dave Poole	30	1.5	N/A
UKIP	Ian Garbutt	21	1.0	–3.2
Majority		368	18.3	−8.2
Rejected ballots		4	0.20	
Turnout		2,014	26.14	
Registered electors		7,705		
Liberal Democrats hold				

==== Upperton ====
The by-election was triggered by the resignation of Liberal Democrat councillor Robin Maxted for personal reasons.

Upperton, 1 May 2025
Party	Candidate	Votes	%	±%
Liberal Democrats	Tom Nevill	1,371	49.1	–2.1
Conservative	Tim Whelan	671	24.0	–4.3
Reform	Nick Appleby	482	17.3	N/A
Labour	Margaret Robinson	144	5.2	–4.5
Independent	Mark Thomson	109	3.9	N/A
UKIP	Colin Horscroft	15	0.5	N/A
Majority		700	25.1	
Rejected ballots		9	0.32	
Turnout		2,804	32.63	
Registered electors		8,594		
Liberal Democrats hold		Swing	▲1.1	
