= Eastbourne Town Hall =

Municipal building in Eastbourne, East Sussex, England

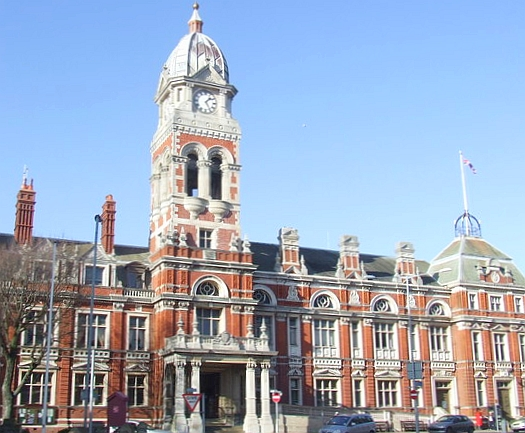
- Eastbourne Town Hall

- Shown in East Sussex
- 50.7667°N 0.2778°E
- Location: Grove Road, Eastbourne

History
- Built: 1886

Site notes
- Architect: William Tadman-Faulkes
- Architectural style: Renaissance style

Listed Building – Grade II
- Official name: Eastbourne Town Hall
- Designated: 24 February 1994
- Reference no.: 1043621

Eastbourne Town Hall is a municipal building in Grove Road, Eastbourne, East Sussex, England. The town hall, which is the meeting place of Eastbourne Borough Council, is a Grade II listed building.

== History ==
=== Design and construction ===
After significant population growth in the second half of the 19th century, particularly associated with the tourists arriving following the opening of the London, Brighton and South Coast Railway, Eastbourne became a municipal borough in 1883. Civic leaders decided it was necessary to procure a town hall: the site they selected was on the edge of the town at that time and known as Stocks Bank.

The scheme was subject to a design competition which was won by William Tadman-Faulkes but the result was initially set aside on the grounds of cost until agreement was reached that the design work would proceed under the supervision of Henry Currey, architect to the Duke of Devonshire, who was the landowner and instigator of much of the local development at the time. The foundation stone for the new building was laid by Lord Edward Cavendish, the third son of the Duke of Devonshire, on 9 October 1884. It was designed in the Renaissance style, built by a local contractor, James Peerless, and was officially opened by the mayor, Councillor George Boulton, on 20 October 1886.

The design involved an asymmetrical main frontage with sixteen bays facing onto Grove Road with the end bays slightly projected forwards and topped with mansard roofs; the sixth bay from the left, which also slightly projected forward, featured a portico with four Ionic order columns supporting a parapet and a shield; there was a casement window flanked by Corinthian order pilasters on the first floor, a Diocletian window flanked by more Corinthian order pilasters at attic level and a 130 feet (40 m) two-stage clock tower with a dome above. The clock, which was designed and manufactured by Gillett & Johnston, was installed in 1892, along with five bells (also by Gillett & Johnston) to sound the hours and quarters. Internally, the principal rooms were the council chamber and the mayor's parlour on the first floor as well as the courtroom on the ground floor.

=== Early 20th century ===
A large crowd and a military parade were present for the proclamation of the accession of King George V which was read out at the town hall on 6 May 1910.

In the early 20th century the town hall had its own courtroom and police station and, after the 17-year-old Irene Munro had been murdered by two men, Jack Field and William Gray, on 19 August 1920, it was to the town hall mortuary that her body was taken: Field and Gray were later convicted and hanged for the crime.

=== Mid 20th century ===
Queen Elizabeth II, accompanied by the Duke of Edinburgh visited the town hall and signed the visitors book during a tour of East Sussex in 1966. The town hall continued to serve as the headquarters of Eastbourne County Borough Council for much of the 20th century and remained the local seat of government when Eastbourne District Council was formed in 1974. Works of art in the town hall include a plaster copy of the marble statue by Sir William Reid Dick of Freeman Freeman-Thomas, 1st Marquess of Willingdon which stands in Coronation Park, Delhi. Willingdon was born in Eastbourne and went on to be Governor General of Canada and then Viceroy and Governor-General of India.

== See also ==
- Listed buildings in Eastbourne
