= 2004 Eastbourne Borough Council election =

2004 UK local government election

Map of the results of the 2004 Eastbourne Borough Council election. Conservatives in blue and Liberal Democrats in yellow.

The 2004 Eastbourne Borough Council election took place on 10 June 2004 to elect members of Eastbourne Borough Council in East Sussex, England. One third of the council was up for election and the Conservative Party gained overall control of the council from the Liberal Democrats.

After the election, the composition of the council was:

- Conservative 14
- Liberal Democrats 13

== Background ==
10 seats were contested at the election, with 2 seats being available in Old Town ward after Liberal Democrat councillor Bert Leggett stood down.

During the campaign both the national Liberal Democrat leader Charles Kennedy and Conservative leader Michael Howard came to Eastbourne to support their parties.

== Election result ==
The Conservatives gained a seat from the Liberal Democrats to take a one-seat majority on the council with 14 councillors, compared to 13 for the Liberal Democrats. The Conservative gain came in Old Town ward, where Conservative Simon Herbert gained one of the two seats from the Liberal Democrats with 1,926 votes, while Liberal Democrat Maurice Skilton held the other seat with 1,854 votes. Overall turnout at the election was 40.97%, up from 33.6% at the 2003 election.

Eastbourne local election result 2004
Party	Seats	Gains	Losses	Net gain/loss	Seats %	Votes %	Votes	+/−
Conservative	5	1	0	+1	50.0	50.3	15,709	+0.8
Liberal Democrats	5	0	1	-1	50.0	36.0	11,230	-3.2
Green	0	0	0	0	0.0	7.9	2,464	+3.8
Labour	0	0	0	0	0.0	5.9	1,827	-0.8

== Ward results ==
Devonshire
Party	Candidate	Votes	%	±%
Liberal Democrats	Margaret Bannister	1,177	44.7	−13.4
Conservative	Kenneth Graham	1,040	39.5	+5.2
Green	Clive Gross	239	9.1	+1.5
Labour	Richard Goude	178	6.8	+6.8
Majority		137	5.2	−18.5
Turnout		2,634	35.3	+8.2
Liberal Democrats hold		Swing		

Hampden Park
Party	Candidate	Votes	%	±%
Liberal Democrats	Michael Thompson	988	44.9	−5.0
Conservative	Edward Abella	636	28.9	+7.3
Labour	David Brinson	356	16.2	−6.7
Green	Leslie Dalton	222	10.1	+4.5
Majority		352	16.0	−10.9
Turnout		2,202	31.6	+5.5
Liberal Democrats hold		Swing		

Langney
Party	Candidate	Votes	%	±%
Liberal Democrats	Irene Sims	1,210	49.8	+2.9
Conservative	Thomas Walters	921	37.9	−3.0
Labour	Steven Scott	164	6.7	−2.0
Green	Christine Quarrington	137	5.6	+2.1
Majority		289	11.9	+5.9
Turnout		2,432	34.1	+10.2
Liberal Democrats hold		Swing		

Meads
Party	Candidate	Votes	%	±%
Conservative	Barry Taylor	2,672	71.2	−0.1
Liberal Democrats	Steven Wallis	589	15.7	−1.1
Green	Kate Arnold	271	7.2	+2.2
Labour	Dennis Scard	221	5.9	−1.1
Majority		2,083	55.5	+1.0
Turnout		3,753	49.6	+10.2
Conservative hold		Swing		

Old Town (2 seats)
Party	Candidate	Votes	%	±%
Conservative	Simon Herbert	1,926		
Liberal Democrats	Maurice Skilton	1,854		
Conservative	John Stanbury	1,816		
Liberal Democrats	Patricia Habets	1,739		
Green	Catharine Birchwood	355		
Green	Jocelyn McCarthy	289		
Labour	Jonathan Pettigrew	155		
Labour	Robert Rossetter	132		
Turnout		8,266	54.9	+8.0
Conservative gain from Liberal Democrats		Swing		
Liberal Democrats hold		Swing		

Ratton
Party	Candidate	Votes	%	±%
Conservative	Barbara Goodall	2,227	65.8	+1.0
Liberal Democrats	Peter Durrant	702	20.7	−2.7
Labour	Martin Falkner	233	6.9	−0.5
Green	Kevin Moore	225	6.6	+2.2
Majority		1,525	45.0	+3.6
Turnout		3,387	44.7	+8.6
Conservative hold		Swing		

St Anthony's
Party	Candidate	Votes	%	±%
Liberal Democrats	Jon Harris	1,441	47.1	−7.1
Conservative	Judith Kim-Symes	1,200	39.2	+6.6
Green	Hugh Norris	242	7.9	+7.9
Labour	Nora Ring	176	5.8	−1.8
Majority		241	7.9	−13.8
Turnout		3,059	38.4	+7.8
Liberal Democrats hold		Swing		

Sovereign
Party	Candidate	Votes	%	±%
Conservative	Christopher Williams	1,517	59.4	+4.7
Liberal Democrats	Margaret Salsbury	806	31.6	−13.7
Green	Nancy Dalton	229	9.0	+9.0
Majority		711	27.9	+18.5
Turnout		2,552	38.1	+0.3
Conservative hold		Swing		

Upperton
Party	Candidate	Votes	%	±%
Conservative	Robert Lacey	1,754	59.6	+3.2
Liberal Democrats	Patrick Rodohan	724	24.6	−7.6
Green	Finbar O'Shea	255	8.7	+3.2
Labour	Margaret Pettigrew	212	7.2	+1.4
Majority		1,030	35.0	+10.8
Turnout		2,945	40.1	+5.1
Conservative hold		Swing		
