= 2007 Eastbourne Borough Council election =

2007 UK local government election

Map of the results of the 2007 Eastbourne Borough Council election. Liberal Democrats in yellow and Conservatives in blue.

The 2007 Eastbourne Borough Council election took place on 3 May 2007 to elect members of Eastbourne Borough Council in East Sussex, England. The whole council was up for election and the Liberal Democrats gained overall control of the council from the Conservative Party.

== Background ==
After the 2006 election the Conservatives controlled the council with a majority of 3, with 15 seats, compared to 12 for the Liberal Democrats. For 2007 the council changed from the previous system whereby a third of the council was elected each year, to have the whole council elected every 4 years, after a unanimous vote by the council. Earlier in 2007 Norman Marsh left the Liberal Democrats to sit as an Independent, while Liberal Democrat Irene Sims resigned from the council.

A record 89 candidates contested the election, up from the previous high of 81 in 2002 when the entire council was last elected. Both the Conservatives and Liberal Democrats stood a full 27 candidates, compared to 12 for Labour, 9 Green Party and 5 UK Independence Party. Councillors standing down at the election included Conservatives Patrick Bowker and David Stevens, Liberal Democrat Robert Slater and independent Norman Marsh.

== Election result ==
The Liberal Democrats made 9 gains to take control of the council from the Conservatives for the first time since 2004, with 8 of the gains being from the Conservatives. The Liberal Democrats gained seats in Old Town, Sovereign and Upperton wards to hold 20 seats and have a majority of 13, while the Conservatives were reduced to 7 seats. The Conservatives losses included the leader of the council, Ian Lucas, in Old Town and the cabinet member for finance, Chris Williams, in Sovereign. Overall turnout at the election was 42.26%, compared to 40.70% in 2006.

The Liberal Democrat victory was attributed to the introduction of parking charges in Eastbourne by the Conservative-controlled East Sussex County Council and to a decision by borough councillors to increase their expenses by 52%. Following the election David Tutt became the new leader of the council, while the national Liberal Democrat Leader Menzies Campbell came to Eastbourne to celebrate the result.

Eastbourne local election result 2007
Party	Seats	Gains	Losses	Net gain/loss	Seats %	Votes %	Votes	+/−
Liberal Democrats	20	9	0	+9	74.1	48.6	40,571	+8.1
Conservative	7	0	8	-8	25.9	41.9	34,975	-4.6
Green	0	0	0	0	0.0	5.8	4,846	-2.1
Labour	0	0	0	0	0.0	2.6	2,211	-2.5
UKIP	0	0	0	0	0.0	1.1	909	+1.1
Independent	0	0	1	-1	0.0	N/A	0	N/A

== Ward results ==
Devonshire (3 seats)
Party	Candidate	Votes	%	±%
Liberal Democrats	Margaret Bannister	1,598		
Liberal Democrats	Neil Stanley	1,442		
Liberal Democrats	Steven Wallis	1,395		
Conservative	Camilla Lau	632		
Conservative	Sandra Elkin	619		
Conservative	Marco Giorgi	569		
Green	Simon Payne	229		
Green	Zoe Vonderdell	224		
Labour	Keith Gell	160		
UKIP	Len Richardson	157		
Labour	Richard Goude	154		
Turnout		2,645	34.5	−0.9
Liberal Democrats hold		Swing		
Liberal Democrats hold		Swing		
Liberal Democrats hold		Swing		

Hampden Park (3 seats)
Party	Candidate	Votes	%	±%
Liberal Democrats	Mary Pooley	1,338		
Liberal Democrats	Olive Woodall	1,277		
Liberal Democrats	Mike Thompson	1,138		
Conservative	Christopher Brenchley	555		
Conservative	Bill Bailey	499		
Conservative	Milly Skriczka	417		
Labour	Ann Ring	274		
Labour	David Brinson	230		
Green	Leslie Dalton	208		
Labour	David Salmon	197		
Green	Finn O'Shea	181		
Green	Ivor Hueting	164		
Turnout		2,317	32.0	−1.5
Liberal Democrats hold		Swing		
Liberal Democrats hold		Swing		
Liberal Democrats hold		Swing		

Langney (3 seats)
Party	Candidate	Votes	%	±%
Liberal Democrats	Harun Miah	1,453		
Liberal Democrats	Troy Tester	1,333		
Liberal Democrats	Daniel Purchese	1,310		
Conservative	Tony Freebody	912		
Conservative	Marcus Maddison-White	826		
Conservative	John Stanbury	806		
Green	Chris Quarrington	192		
Labour	Colin Akers	174		
Green	Amy Erridge	163		
Turnout		2,570	34.0	+1.7
Liberal Democrats hold		Swing		
Liberal Democrats hold		Swing		
Liberal Democrats hold		Swing		

Meads (3 seats)
Party	Candidate	Votes	%	±%
Conservative	Barry Taylor	2,407		
Conservative	David Elkin	2,387		
Conservative	Nigel Goodyear	2,329		
Liberal Democrats	Margaret Ticehurst	729		
Liberal Democrats	Jean Fisher	692		
Liberal Democrats	Brendan Creaven	681		
Green	Kate Arnold	457		
Green	Harry Boys	375		
Green	Dorothy Forsyth	299		
Labour	Dennis Scard	220		
Turnout		3,754	47.9	−1.8
Conservative hold		Swing		
Conservative hold		Swing		
Conservative hold		Swing		

Old Town (3 seats)
Party	Candidate	Votes	%	±%
Liberal Democrats	Carolyn Heaps	2,202		
Liberal Democrats	Andrew Goodwin	2,007		
Liberal Democrats	Gregory Szanto	1,939		
Conservative	Anne Angel	1,890		
Conservative	Ian Lucas	1,772		
Conservative	Simon Herbert	1,667		
Green	Clive Gross	681		
UKIP	Anne Chambers	191		
Labour	Ann Cottrell	190		
Turnout		4,450	54.8	+4.3
Liberal Democrats gain from Conservative		Swing		
Liberal Democrats gain from Conservative		Swing		
Liberal Democrats gain from Conservative		Swing		

Ratton (3 seats)
Party	Candidate	Votes	%	±%
Conservative	Colin Belsey	2,076	55.8	
Conservative	Barbara Goodall	1,970	52.9	
Conservative	Sandie Howlett	1,920	51.6	
Liberal Democrats	Patricia Hearn	1,184	31.8	
Liberal Democrats	John Moore	1,128	30.3	
Liberal Democrats	Brian Staker	1,023	27.5	
Green	Nancy Dalton	332	8.9	
UKIP	Ken Alderton	270	7.3	
Green	Kev Moore	240	6.4	
Labour	Jim Nolan	172	4.6	
Turnout		3722	48.3	+1.7
Conservative hold		Swing		
Conservative hold		Swing		
Conservative hold		Swing		

St Anthony's (3 seats)
Party	Candidate	Votes	%	±%
Liberal Democrats	David Tutt	2,344		
Liberal Democrats	Jon Harris	2,242		
Liberal Democrats	Gill Mattock	2,193		
Conservative	Jane Challen	766		
Conservative	Tom Stoddart	735		
Conservative	Susan Steinberg	710		
Green	Hugh Norris	199		
Labour	Ian Culshaw	170		
Green	Rob Sier	156		
Turnout		3,419	41.3	+1.5
Liberal Democrats hold		Swing		
Liberal Democrats hold		Swing		
Liberal Democrats gain from Independent		Swing		

Sovereign (3 seats)
Party	Candidate	Votes	%	±%
Liberal Democrats	Susan Morris	1,762		
Liberal Democrats	Michael Bloom	1,756		
Liberal Democrats	Margaret Salsbury	1,692		
Conservative	Patrick Warner	1,379		
Conservative	Tracy Moles	1,298		
Conservative	Christopher Williams	1,294		
Green	Jocelyn McCarthy	269		
Labour	David Mieres	121		
Turnout		3,301	39.0	+2.8
Liberal Democrats gain from Conservative		Swing		
Liberal Democrats gain from Conservative		Swing		
Liberal Democrats gain from Conservative		Swing		

Upperton (3 seats)
Party	Candidate	Votes	%	±%
Liberal Democrats	Alex Hough	1,610		
Liberal Democrats	Rebecca Madell	1,573		
Conservative	Graham Marsden	1,557		
Conservative	Bob Lacey	1,534		
Liberal Democrats	Pat Rodohan	1,530		
Conservative	Ann Murray	1,449		
Green	Stephanie Lewis	253		
Green	Liam Stephens	224		
Labour	Elizabeth Goude	149		
UKIP	Geraldine Mackillop	146		
UKIP	Paul Murden	145		
Turnout		3,557	46.3	+5.0
Liberal Democrats gain from Conservative		Swing		
Liberal Democrats gain from Conservative		Swing		
Conservative hold		Swing		
