= 2006 Eastbourne Borough Council election =

2006 UK local government election

Map of the results of the 2006 Eastbourne Borough Council election. Conservatives in blue and Liberal Democrats in yellow.

The 2006 Eastbourne Council election took place on 4 May 2006 to elect members of Eastbourne Borough Council in East Sussex, England. One third of the council was up for election and the Conservative Party stayed in overall control of the council.

After the election, the composition of the council was:

- Conservative 15
- Liberal Democrats 12

== Background ==
Before the election the Conservatives controlled the council with 14 seats compared to 13 for the Liberal Democrats, after the Conservatives took control at the 2004 election. 9 seats were contested by a total of 36 candidates, with the Conservatives, Liberal Democrats, Labour Party and Green Party contesting every seat. 2 Liberal Democrat councillors stood down at the election, Chris Berry and Beryl Healy, from Langney and Devonshire wards respectively.

A major issue at the election was parking in Eastbourne, as well as a campaign to save the local hospital from closure.

== Election result ==
The Conservatives stayed in control of the council after gaining one seat from the Liberal Democrats. The only change came in Old Town ward, where Conservative Anne Angel gained the seat with a majority of 253, defeating Liberal Democrat Maurice Skilton, who had been a councillor for over 40 years. Meanwhile, Labour was in fourth place in every ward but one, behind the Green Party. Overall turnout at the election was 40.70%, compared to 40.97% in 2004.

Eastbourne local election result 2006
Party	Seats	Gains	Losses	Net gain/loss	Seats %	Votes %	Votes	+/−
Conservative	5	1	0	+1	55.6	46.5	12,784	-3.8
Liberal Democrats	4	0	1	-1	44.4	40.5	11,149	+4.5
Green	0	0	0	0	0.0	7.9	2,164	0.0
Labour	0	0	0	0	0.0	5.1	1,403	-0.8

== Ward results ==
Devonshire
Party	Candidate	Votes	%	±%
Liberal Democrats	Steven Wallis	1,491	56.8	+12.1
Conservative	Brian Jones	749	28.5	−11.0
Green	Zoe Vonderdell	201	7.7	−1.4
Labour	Richard Goude	184	7.0	+0.2
Majority		742	28.3	+23.1
Turnout		2,625	35.4	+0.1
Liberal Democrats hold		Swing		

Hampden Park
Party	Candidate	Votes	%	±%
Liberal Democrats	Mary Pooley	1,230	53.0	+8.1
Conservative	Edward Abella	632	27.2	−1.7
Labour	David Brinson	251	10.8	−5.4
Green	Leslie Dalton	209	9.0	−1.1
Majority		598	25.8	+9.8
Turnout		2,322	33.5	+1.9
Liberal Democrats hold		Swing		

Langney
Party	Candidate	Votes	%	±%
Liberal Democrats	Troy Tester	1,209	52.0	+2.2
Conservative	Stephanie Walters	809	34.8	−3.1
Green	Christine Quarrington	161	6.9	+1.3
Labour	Colin Akers	147	6.3	−0.4
Majority		400	17.2	+5.3
Turnout		2,326	32.3	−1.8
Liberal Democrats hold		Swing		

Meads
Party	Candidate	Votes	%	±%
Conservative	David Stevens	2,440	66.4	−4.8
Liberal Democrats	John Creaven	756	20.6	+4.9
Green	Kate Arnold	306	8.3	+1.1
Labour	Dennis Scard	173	4.7	−1.2
Majority		1,684	45.8	−9.7
Turnout		3,675	49.7	+0.1
Conservative hold		Swing		

Old Town
Party	Candidate	Votes	%	±%
Conservative	Anne Angel	1,843	46.6	
Liberal Democrats	Maurice Skilton	1,590	40.2	
Green	Clive Gross	416	10.5	
Labour	Helen Sedgewick	109	2.8	
Majority		253	6.4	
Turnout		3,958	50.5	−4.4
Conservative gain from Liberal Democrats		Swing		

Ratton
Party	Candidate	Votes	%	±%
Conservative	Colin Belsey	2,091	59.6	−6.2
Liberal Democrats	Brian Staker	1,035	29.5	+8.8
Green	Kevin Moore	225	6.4	−0.2
Labour	Nora Ring	160	4.6	−2.3
Majority		1,056	30.1	−14.9
Turnout		3,511	46.6	+1.9
Conservative hold		Swing		

St Anthony's
Party	Candidate	Votes	%	±%
Liberal Democrats	David Tutt	1,913	59.9	+12.8
Conservative	Tracy Moles	962	30.1	−9.1
Green	Hugh Norris	204	6.4	−1.5
Labour	Sharon Wentworth	116	3.6	−2.2
Majority		951	29.8	+21.9
Turnout		3,195	39.8	+1.4
Liberal Democrats hold		Swing		

Sovereign
Party	Candidate	Votes	%	±%
Conservative	Patrick Bowker	1,597	56.7	−2.7
Liberal Democrats	Margaret Salsbury	914	32.4	+0.8
Green	Jocelyn McCarthy	181	6.4	−2.6
Labour	David Mieres	125	4.4	+4.4
Majority		683	24.2	−3.7
Turnout		2,817	36.2	−1.9
Conservative hold		Swing		

Upperton
Party	Candidate	Votes	%	±%
Conservative	Graham Marsden	1,661	54.1	−5.5
Liberal Democrats	Patrick Rodohan	1,011	32.9	+8.3
Green	Catharine Birchwood	261	8.5	−0.2
Labour	Elizabeth Goude	138	4.5	−2.7
Majority		650	21.2	−13.8
Turnout		3,071	41.3	+1.2
Conservative hold		Swing		
