= 2003 Eastbourne Borough Council election =

2003 UK local government election

Map of the results of the 2003 Eastbourne Borough Council election. Conservatives in blue and Liberal Democrats in yellow.

The 2003 Eastbourne Borough Council election took place on 1 May 2003 to elect members of Eastbourne Borough Council in East Sussex, England. One third of the council was up for election and the Liberal Democrats stayed in overall control of the council.

After the election, the composition of the council was:

- Liberal Democrats 14
- Conservative 13

== Background ==
Before the election the Liberal Democrats had a 3-seat majority on the council, with 15 councillors compared to 12 for the Conservative Party. A total of 33 candidates stood for the 9 seats being contested, with candidates from the Liberal Democrats, Conservatives, Labour Party, Green Party and 1 from the UK Independence Party.

The Conservatives campaigned hard on the 38% rise in council tax, fourth highest in the country, that the Liberal Democrat controlled council had made. However the Liberal Democrats defended the rise, saying there had been a poor central government grant and that most of the rise had been due to needing to replace the company doing refuse collection. The Liberal Democrats also pointed to the reopening of the Old Town Library and the Beachy Head Countryside Centre, with anger at these closures having helped the Liberal Democrats gain control at the 2002 election.

During the campaign the Conservative shadow deputy prime minister David Davis visited Eastbourne to support the Conservatives at the election.

== Election result ==
The Liberal Democrats lost a seat to the Conservatives, reducing their majority on the council to just 1 seat. The Conservative gain came in Old Town ward, where Ian Lucas took the seat for the party, with the increase in council tax being reported as a major reason for the Conservative gain. Overall turnout at the election was 33.6%, compared to 33.9% in 2002.

Eastbourne local election result 2003
Party	Seats	Gains	Losses	Net gain/loss	Seats %	Votes %	Votes	+/−
Conservative	5	1	0	+1	55.5	49.5	11,222	+8.1
Liberal Democrats	4	0	1	-1	44.4	39.2	8,880	-10.1
Labour	0	0	0	0	0.0	6.7	1,508	+1.7
Green	0	0	0	0	0.0	4.1	923	+0.8
UKIP	0	0	0	0	0.0	0.6	138	+0.1

== Ward results ==
Devonshire
Party	Candidate	Votes	%	±%
Liberal Democrats	Neil Stanley	1,222	58.1	
Conservative	Kenneth Graham	723	34.3	
Green	Nancy Dalton	160	7.6	
Majority		499	23.8	
Turnout		2,105	27.1	−0.8
Liberal Democrats hold		Swing		

Hampden Park
Party	Candidate	Votes	%	±%
Liberal Democrats	Olive Woodall	955	49.9	
Labour	David Brinson	439	22.9	
Conservative	Edward Abella	414	21.6	
Green	Leslie Dalton	107	5.6	
Majority		516	27.0	
Turnout		1,915	26.1	−3.1
Liberal Democrats hold		Swing		

Langney
Party	Candidate	Votes	%	±%
Liberal Democrats	Robert Slater	828	46.9	
Conservative	Thomas Walters	722	40.9	
Labour	Jonathan Pettigrew	153	8.7	
Green	Christine Quarrington	62	3.5	
Majority		106	6.0	
Turnout		1,765	23.9	−1.9
Liberal Democrats hold		Swing		

Meads
Party	Candidate	Votes	%	±%
Conservative	David Elkin	2,202	71.3	
Liberal Democrats	Steven Wallis	518	16.8	
Labour	David Buck	216	7.0	
Green	Clive Gross	154	5.0	
Majority		1,684	54.5	
Turnout		3,090	39.4	+0.5
Conservative hold		Swing		

Old Town
Party	Candidate	Votes	%	±%
Conservative	Ian Lucas	1,813	50.2	
Liberal Democrats	John Creaven	1,471	40.8	
Green	Liam Stephens	173	4.8	
Labour	Robert Rossetter	152	4.2	
Majority		342	9.4	
Turnout		3,609	46.9	+1.9
Conservative gain from Liberal Democrats		Swing		

Ratton
Party	Candidate	Votes	%	±%
Conservative	Sandie Howlett	1,803	64.8	
Liberal Democrats	Peter Durrant	652	23.4	
Labour	Martin Falkner	205	7.4	
Green	Kevin Moore	123	4.4	
Majority		1,151	41.4	
Turnout		2,783	36.1	+0.7
Conservative hold		Swing		

St Anthony's
Party	Candidate	Votes	%	±%
Liberal Democrats	Norman Marsh	1,349	54.2	
Conservative	Sheila Charlton	810	32.6	
Labour	Nora Ring	190	7.6	
UKIP	Kenneth Alderton	138	5.5	
Majority		539	21.6	
Turnout		2,487	30.6	−5.2
Liberal Democrats hold		Swing		

Sovereign
Party	Candidate	Votes	%	±%
Conservative	Patrick Warner	1,255	54.7	
Liberal Democrats	Alan Carroll	1,040	45.3	
Majority		215	9.4	
Turnout		2,295	37.8	+6.0
Conservative hold		Swing		

Upperton
Party	Candidate	Votes	%	±%
Conservative	Ann Murray	1,480	56.4	
Liberal Democrats	Stafford Gowland	845	32.2	
Labour	Peter Tucker	153	5.8	
Green	John Morrison	144	5.5	
Majority		635	24.2	
Turnout		2,622	35.0	+1.0
Conservative hold		Swing		
