= 2000 Eastbourne Borough Council election =

2000 UK local government election

The 2000 Eastbourne Borough Council election took place on 4 May 2000 to elect members of Eastbourne Borough Council in East Sussex, England. One third of the council was up for election and the Conservative Party gained overall control of the council from no overall control.

After the election, the composition of the council was:

- Conservative 18
- Liberal Democrats 12

== Election result ==
Overall turnout at the election was 30.90%, down from 32.36% at the 1999 election.

Eastbourne local election result 2000
Party	Seats	Gains	Losses	Net gain/loss	Seats %	Votes %	Votes	+/−
Conservative	7	3	0	+3	70.0	57.1	11,875	+11.1
Liberal Democrats	3	0	3	-3	30.0	35.4	7,370	-7.0
Labour	0	0	0	0	0.0	6.3	1,304	-4.1
Liberal	0	0	0	0	0.0	0.8	169	+0.1
Green	0	0	0	0	0.0	0.4	78	-0.1

== Ward results ==
Devonshire
Party	Candidate	Votes	%	±%
Conservative	David Elkin	886	47.3	+2.3
Liberal Democrats	Beryl Teso	767	41.0	−2.6
Labour	Sharon Wentworth	142	7.6	−3.8
Green	Robert Sier	78	4.2	+4.2
Majority		119	6.4	+5.0
Turnout		1,873	34.7	+0.8
Conservative gain from Liberal Democrats		Swing		

Downside
Party	Candidate	Votes	%	±%
Conservative	John Stanbury	961	49.8	+18.8
Liberal Democrats	Raymond Sparks	833	43.2	−18.3
Labour	Emile Habets	134	7.0	−0.5
Majority		128	6.6	
Turnout		1,928	32.9	−1.2
Conservative gain from Liberal Democrats		Swing		

Hampden Park
Party	Candidate	Votes	%	±%
Liberal Democrats	Michael Thompson	736	49.7	−8.7
Conservative	Russell Riseley	457	30.8	+12.2
Labour	Jonathan Pettigrew	289	19.5	−3.5
Majority		279	18.8	−16.7
Turnout		1,482	24.4	−4.8
Liberal Democrats hold		Swing		

Langney
Party	Candidate	Votes	%	±%
Liberal Democrats	Norman Marsh	1,304	61.7	−1.1
Conservative	Len Meladio	809	38.3	+14.0
Majority		495	23.4	−15.1
Turnout		2,113	21.1	−2.4
Liberal Democrats hold		Swing		

Meads
Party	Candidate	Votes	%	±%
Conservative	Mark Deschamps	2,056	79.6	+5.8
Liberal Democrats	Winifred King	337	13.0	−1.4
Labour	John Pettigrew	190	7.4	+0.2
Majority		1,719	66.6	+7.1
Turnout		2,583	39.9	+2.5
Conservative hold		Swing		

Ocklynge
Party	Candidate	Votes	%	±%
Conservative	Colin Belsey	1,310	59.0	+11.9
Liberal Democrats	John Creaven	911	41.0	−6.6
Majority		399	18.0	
Turnout		2,221	40.1	−2.5
Conservative gain from Liberal Democrats		Swing		

Ratton
Party	Candidate	Votes	%	±%
Conservative	Michael Tunwell	1,391	72.2	+8.3
Liberal Democrats	James Gleeson	205	10.6	−9.1
Liberal	Maria Williamson	169	8.8	+1.9
Labour	David Brinson	161	8.4	−1.1
Majority		1,186	61.6	+17.4
Turnout		1,926	31.0	−3.7
Conservative hold		Swing		

Roselands
Party	Candidate	Votes	%	±%
Liberal Democrats	Jon Harris	895	48.1	−18.4
Conservative	Christopher Williams	782	42.0	+19.1
Labour	John Morrison	185	9.9	−0.7
Majority		113	6.1	−37.6
Turnout		1,862	27.9	−1.2
Liberal Democrats hold		Swing		

St Anthony's
Party	Candidate	Votes	%	±%
Conservative	Margo Smith	1,744	62.0	+7.8
Liberal Democrats	Carolyn Carpenter	867	30.8	−5.3
Labour	Jason Phillips	203	7.2	−2.5
Majority		877	31.2	+13.1
Turnout		2,814	34.5	+0.1
Conservative hold		Swing		

Upperton
Party	Candidate	Votes	%	±%
Conservative	Ann Murray	1,479	74.2	+7.9
Liberal Democrats	Peter Durrant	515	25.8	+2.6
Majority		964	48.3	+5.1
Turnout		1,994	29.2	−1.5
Conservative hold		Swing		

== By-elections between 2000 and 2002 ==
St Anthony's by-election 7 June 2001
Party	Candidate	Votes	%	±%
Conservative	Christopher Williams	2,108	42.4	−19.6
Liberal Democrats	Richard Ellis	2,030	40.8	+10.0
Labour	Jonathan Pettigrew	840	16.9	+9.7
Majority		78	1.6	−29.6
Turnout		4,978	58.0	+23.5
Conservative hold		Swing		
