= Willingdon Down =

Protected area in East Sussex, England

Coordinates: 50.798°N 0.236°E

- Site of Special Scientific Interest
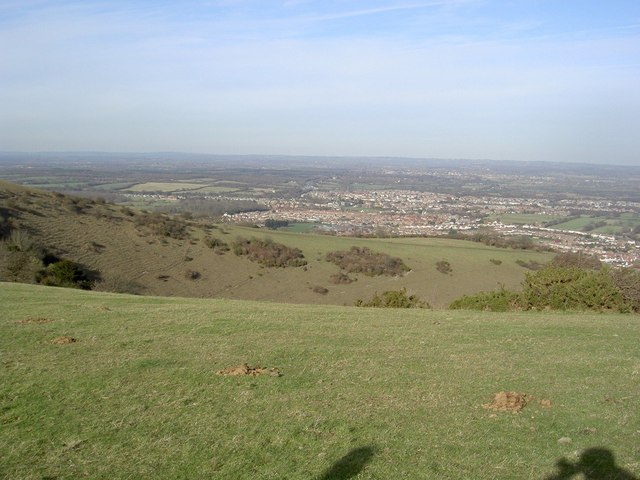
- Location of Willingdon Down.
- Area of search: East Sussex
- Grid reference: TQ 577 022
- Interest: Biological
- Area: 67.5 hectares (167 acres)
- Notification date: 1986
- Location map: Magic Map

Willingdon Down is a 67.5-hectare (167-acre) biological Site of Special Scientific Interest west of Willingdon, a suburb of Eastbourne in East Sussex. Part of it is a Neolithic causewayed enclosure which is a Scheduled Monument

This steeply sloping site on the South Downs is species-rich chalk grassland, a nationally uncommon type of habitat. The dominant grasses are sheep's fescue and upright brome and uncommon plants include field fleawort, bee orchid, round headed rampion, green winged orchid and burnt orchid.

The site is public open access land.

== Land ownership ==
All land within Willingdon Down SSSI is owned by the local authority.
