= 2002 Eastbourne Borough Council election =

2002 UK local government election

Map of the results of the 2002 Eastbourne Borough Council election. Liberal Democrats in yellow and Conservatives in blue.

The 2002 Eastbourne Borough Council election took place on 2 May 2002 to elect members of Eastbourne Borough Council in East Sussex, England. The whole council was up for election with boundary changes since the last election in 2000 reducing the number of seats by 3. The Liberal Democrats gained overall control of the council from the Conservative Party.

== Background ==
Before the election the Conservatives controlled the council with 18 seats, compared to 12 for the Liberal Democrats. The whole council was elected after boundary changes reduced the number of wards from 10 to 9 and the number of councillors from 30 to 27.

== Election result ==
The Liberal Democrats gained a majority of 3 on the council with 15 seats, compared to 12 for the Conservatives. Over a quarter of the Liberal Democrat councillors elected were new to the role, with the Liberal Democrat gains in Old Town and St Anthony's wards being reported as crucial to them taking control. Overall turnout at the election was 33.9%, up from 30.9% in 2000.

The Liberal Democrat success was put down to controversy over the Old Town library, issues such as anti-social behaviour and abandoned cars, and boundary changes.

Eastbourne local election result 2002
Party	Seats	Gains	Losses	Net gain/loss	Seats %	Votes %	Votes	+/−
Liberal Democrats	15			+3	55.6	49.3	32,996	+13.9
Conservative	12			-6	44.4	41.4	27,700	-15.7
Labour	0			0	0.0	5.0	3,356	-1.3
Green	0			0	0.0	3.3	2,241	+2.9
Independent	0			0	0.0	0.5	321	+0.5
UKIP	0			0	0.0	0.5	303	+0.5

== Ward results ==
Devonshire (3 seats)
Party	Candidate	Votes	%	±%
Liberal Democrats	Beryl Healy	1,600		
Liberal Democrats	Beryl Teso	1,480		
Liberal Democrats	Neil Stanley	1,462		
Conservative	Martin Charlton	515		
Conservative	Sandra Elkin	500		
Conservative	Diane Leagas	453		
Green	Daniel Richardson	269		
Labour	Peter Tucker	223		
Turnout		6,502	27.9	

Hampden Park (3 seats)
Party	Candidate	Votes	%	±%
Liberal Democrats	Mary Pooley	1,278		
Liberal Democrats	Michael Thompson	1,149		
Liberal Democrats	Olive Woodall	1,145		
Labour	Nora Ring	523		
Labour	David Brinson	514		
Labour	Martin Falkner	451		
Conservative	Jeanie Sowerby	328		
Conservative	Pamela Cook	321		
Conservative	Russell Riseley	312		
Green	Leslie Dalton	114		
Green	Finbar O'Shea	112		
Green	Richard Luxford	79		
Turnout		6,326	29.2	

Langney (3 seats)
Party	Candidate	Votes	%	±%
Liberal Democrats	Christopher Berry	1,255		
Liberal Democrats	Irene Sims	1,178		
Liberal Democrats	Robert Slater	1,118		
Conservative	Alexander Richards	596		
Conservative	Iain Andrews	574		
Conservative	Thomas Walters	554		
Labour	John Morrison	139		
Labour	Jonathan Pettigrew	109		
Green	Christine Quarrington	86		
Turnout		5,609	25.8	

Meads (3 seats)
Party	Candidate	Votes	%	±%
Conservative	David Stevens	2,001		
Conservative	Barry Taylor	1,967		
Conservative	David Elkin	1,949		
Liberal Democrats	Beverley Berry	731		
Liberal Democrats	Margaret Ticehurst	686		
Liberal Democrats	Kevin Aylott	662		
Green	Clive Gross	351		
Labour	John Pettigrew	280		
UKIP	Kenneth Alderton	174		
UKIP	Royston Maryan	129		
Turnout		8,930	38.9	

Old Town (3 seats)
Party	Candidate	Votes	%	±%
Liberal Democrats	Albert Leggett	2,161		
Liberal Democrats	Maurice Skilton	2,153		
Liberal Democrats	John Creaven	1,942		
Conservative	Ian Lucas	1,252		
Conservative	Simon Herbert	1,166		
Conservative	John Stanbury	1,156		
Green	Liam Stevens	408		
Labour	Robert Rossetter	216		
Independent	Michael Phipp	146		
Turnout		10,600	45.0	

Ratton (3 seats)
Party	Candidate	Votes	%	±%
Conservative	Colin Belsey	1,641	58.4	
Conservative	Barbara Goodall	1,628	57.9	
Conservative	Sandie Howlett	1,564	55.6	
Liberal Democrats	Jacqueline Harris	806	28.7	
Liberal Democrats	Penelope Cunliffe-Lister	793	28.2	
Liberal Democrats	Mary Shmoller	661	23.5	
Labour	David Buck	295	10.5	
Green	Nancy Dalton	242	8.6	
Turnout		2,812	35.4	

St Anthony's (3 seats)
Party	Candidate	Votes	%	±%
Liberal Democrats	David Tutt	2,005		
Liberal Democrats	John Harris	1,987		
Liberal Democrats	Norman Marsh	1,907		
Conservative	Sheila Charlton	827		
Conservative	John Davidson	762		
Conservative	John Wilton	705		
Labour	Helen Sedgewick	221		
Green	Robert Sier	164		
Turnout		8,578	35.8	

Sovereign (3 seats)
Party	Candidate	Votes	%	±%
Conservative	Patrick Bowker	1,001		
Conservative	Christopher Williams	970		
Conservative	Patrick Warner	925		
Liberal Democrats	Alan Carroll	648		
Liberal Democrats	Michael Bloom	638		
Liberal Democrats	Richard Ellis	632		
Independent	Linus Gunning	175		
Labour	Jacqueline Pilkington	172		
Green	Jocelyn McCarthy	124		
Turnout		5,285	31.8	

Upperton (3 seats)
Party	Candidate	Votes	%	±%
Conservative	Graham Marsden	1,390		
Conservative	Robert Lacey	1,332		
Conservative	Ann Murray	1,311		
Liberal Democrats	Troy Tester	989		
Liberal Democrats	Brian Whitby	966		
Liberal Democrats	Stuart Pritcher	964		
Green	Susan Montague	292		
Labour	Michael Tucker	213		
Turnout		7,457	34.0	
