= 1999 Eastbourne Borough Council election =

1999 UK local government election

The 1999 Eastbourne Borough Council election took place on 6 May 1999 to elect members of Eastbourne Borough Council in East Sussex, England. One third of the council was up for election and the Liberal Democrats lost overall control of the council to no overall control.

After the election, the composition of the council was:

- Liberal Democrats 15
- Conservative 15

== Election result ==
The Conservative Party gained two seats from the Liberal Democrats to move the two parties level on 15 seats each. This was the first time the Liberal Democrats had not had a majority in eight years, but they retained control through the mayor's casting vote. Overall turnout at the election was 32.36%, slightly up on the 31.77% at the 1998 election.

Eastbourne local election result 1999
Party	Seats	Gains	Losses	Net gain/loss	Seats %	Votes %	Votes	+/−
Conservative	5	2	0	+2	50.0	46.0	9,992	+6.0
Liberal Democrats	5	0	2	-2	50.0	42.4	9,206	-5.8
Labour	0	0	0	0	0.0	10.4	2,265	+0.2
Liberal	0	0	0	0	0.0	0.7	149	+0.2
Green	0	0	0	0	0.0	0.5	116	+0.5

== Ward results ==
Devonshire
Party	Candidate	Votes	%	±%
Conservative	Mark Roberts	839	45.0	+2.2
Liberal Democrats	Brian Jones	812	43.6	+0.9
Labour	Barrie Smith	213	11.4	−3.1
Majority		27	1.4	+1.3
Turnout		1,864	33.9	+2.8
Conservative gain from Liberal Democrats		Swing		

Downside
Party	Candidate	Votes	%	±%
Liberal Democrats	Maurice Skilton	1,219	61.5	−8.0
Conservative	John Stanbury	615	31.0	+10.3
Labour	Steven Wallis	148	7.5	−2.3
Majority		604	30.5	−18.3
Turnout		1,982	34.1	+1.8
Liberal Democrats hold		Swing		

Hampden Park
Party	Candidate	Votes	%	±%
Liberal Democrats	Olive Woodall	1,035	58.4	−1.2
Labour	Alan French	407	23.0	−3.0
Conservative	Jeanie Sowerby	329	18.6	+4.2
Majority		628	35.5	+1.9
Turnout		1,771	29.2	+0.5
Liberal Democrats hold		Swing		

Langney
Party	Candidate	Votes	%	±%
Liberal Democrats	Beverley Berry	1,464	62.8	
Conservative	Len Meladio	567	24.3	
Labour	Agnes Reid	299	12.8	
Majority		897	38.5	
Turnout		2,330	23.5	+0.4
Liberal Democrats hold		Swing		

Meads
Party	Candidate	Votes	%	±%
Conservative	David Stevens	1,841	73.8	−0.2
Liberal Democrats	Margaret Ticehurst	358	14.4	−11.6
Labour	Peter Worster	179	7.2	+7.2
Green	Sally Boys	116	4.7	+4.7
Majority		1,483	59.5	+11.5
Turnout		2,494	37.4	−1.0
Conservative hold		Swing		

Ocklynge
Party	Candidate	Votes	%	±%
Liberal Democrats	Ron Parsons	1,121	47.6	+3.7
Conservative	Sandie Howlett	1,108	47.1	−1.5
Labour	James Brook	125	5.3	−2.2
Majority		13	0.6	
Turnout		2,354	42.6	+5.5
Liberal Democrats hold		Swing		

Ratton
Party	Candidate	Votes	%	±%
Conservative	Barbara Goodall	1,376	63.9	+1.5
Liberal Democrats	Jon Harris	425	19.7	−0.3
Labour	Emile Habets	204	9.5	−2.0
Liberal	Maria-Theresia Williamson	149	6.9	+0.9
Majority		951	44.2	+1.8
Turnout		2,154	34.7	−0.8
Conservative hold		Swing		

Roselands
Party	Candidate	Votes	%	±%
Liberal Democrats	Neil Stanley	1,293	66.5	
Conservative	Roger Gristwood	444	22.9	
Labour	Jonathan Pettigrew	206	10.6	
Majority		849	43.7	
Turnout		1,943	29.1	+0.2
Liberal Democrats hold		Swing		

St Anthony's
Party	Candidate	Votes	%	±%
Conservative	Patrick Bowker	1,499	54.2	+0.1
Liberal Democrats	Richard Ellis	999	36.1	+1.5
Labour	Robert Rossetter	267	9.7	−1.6
Majority		500	18.1	−1.4
Turnout		2,765	34.4	+0.6
Conservative gain from Liberal Democrats		Swing		

Upperton
Party	Candidate	Votes	%	±%
Conservative	Graham Marsden	1,374	66.3	+13.3
Liberal Democrats	Linda Beckmann	480	23.2	−14.4
Labour	Eileen Cronin	217	10.5	+1.1
Majority		894	43.2	+27.8
Turnout		2,071	30.7	−2.5
Conservative hold		Swing		
