= 1998 Eastbourne Borough Council election =

1998 UK local government election

The 1998 Eastbourne Borough Council election took place on 7 May 1998 to elect members of Eastbourne Borough Council in East Sussex, England. One third of the council was up for election and the Liberal Democrats stayed in overall control of the council.

After the election, the composition of the council was:

- Liberal Democrats 18
- Conservative 12

== Election result ==
2 seats were contested in Langney and Roselands wards after the resignation of the councillors Lesley Morris and John Ungar respectively. Overall turnout at the election was 31.77%, down from 36.35% in 1996.

Eastbourne local election result 1998
Party	Seats	Gains	Losses	Net gain/loss	Seats %	Votes %	Votes	+/−
Liberal Democrats	6	0	3	-3	50.0	48.2	11,993	
Conservative	6	3	0	+3	50.0	40.0	9,949	
Labour	0	0	0	0	0.0	10.2	2,549	
Independent	0	0	0	0	0.0	1.0	250	
Liberal	0	0	0	0	0.0	0.5	133	

== Ward results ==
Devonshire
Party	Candidate	Votes	%	±%
Conservative	Sheila Charlton	737	42.8	
Liberal Democrats	Beverley Berry	735	42.7	
Labour	Jacqueline Frisby	249	14.5	
Majority		2	0.1	
Turnout		1,721	31.1	
Conservative hold		Swing		

Downside
Party	Candidate	Votes	%	±%
Liberal Democrats	Albert Leggett	1,337	69.5	
Conservative	Christian Usher	399	20.7	
Labour	Robert Rossetter	188	9.8	
Majority		938	48.8	
Turnout		1,924	32.3	
Liberal Democrats hold		Swing		

Hampden Park
Party	Candidate	Votes	%	±%
Liberal Democrats	Mary Pooley	1,039	59.6	
Labour	Alan French	453	26.0	
Conservative	Jeanie Sowerby	251	14.4	
Majority		586	33.6	
Turnout		1,743	28.7	
Liberal Democrats hold		Swing		

Langney (2 seats)
Party	Candidate	Votes	%	±%
Liberal Democrats	Gary Potter	1,413		
Liberal Democrats	Robert Kerr	1,383		
Conservative	Ronald Hedger	478		
Conservative	Leonard Meladio	412		
Labour	Agnes Reid	307		
Independent	Steven Wallis	250		
Turnout		4,243	23.1	
Liberal Democrats hold		Swing		
Liberal Democrats hold		Swing		

Meads
Party	Candidate	Votes	%	±%
Conservative	Barry Taylor	1,875	74.0	
Liberal Democrats	Shirley Bloom	658	26.0	
Majority		1,217	48.0	
Turnout		2,533	38.4	
Conservative hold		Swing		

Ocklynge
Party	Candidate	Votes	%	±%
Conservative	Mark Neeham	995	48.6	
Liberal Democrats	Walter James	900	43.9	
Labour	John Morrison	154	7.5	
Majority		95	4.6	
Turnout		2,049	37.1	
Conservative gain from Liberal Democrats		Swing		

Ratton
Party	Candidate	Votes	%	±%
Conservative	Frederick Higgins	1,384	62.4	
Liberal Democrats	John Harris	444	20.0	
Labour	John Pettigrew	256	11.5	
Liberal	Mona-Theresia Williamson	133	6.0	
Majority		940	42.4	
Turnout		2,217	35.5	
Conservative hold		Swing		

Roselands (2 seats)
Party	Candidate	Votes	%	±%
Liberal Democrats	Beryl Healy	1,269		
Liberal Democrats	Neil Stanley	1,070		
Conservative	Roger Gristwood	434		
Conservative	Roger Wesson	383		
Labour	Emile Habets	222		
Labour	Jonathan Pettigrew	216		
Turnout		3,594	28.9	
Liberal Democrats hold		Swing		
Liberal Democrats hold		Swing		

St Anthony's
Party	Candidate	Votes	%	±%
Conservative	Robert Backhouse	1,419	54.1	
Liberal Democrats	James Gleeson	907	34.6	
Labour	John Carmody	295	11.3	
Majority		512	19.5	
Turnout		2,621	33.8	
Conservative gain from Liberal Democrats		Swing		

Upperton
Party	Candidate	Votes	%	±%
Conservative	Robert Lacey	1,182	53.0	
Liberal Democrats	Brian Whitby	838	37.6	
Labour	Eileen Cronin	209	9.4	
Majority		344	15.4	
Turnout		2,229	33.2	
Conservative gain from Liberal Democrats		Swing		

== By-elections between 1998 and 1999 ==
A by-election was held on 3 September 1998 in Ratton ward after the resignation of Scott Stevens. Conservative Barbara Goodall gained the seat from the Liberal Democrats.

Ratton by-election 3 September 1998
Party	Candidate	Votes	%	±%
Conservative	Barbara Goodall	1,183	57.4	
Liberal Democrats	Jon Harris	741	36.0	
Labour	Robert Rossetter	134	6.5	
Majority		442	21.4	
Turnout		2,058	32.6	
Conservative gain from Liberal Democrats		Swing		
