= Dennis Scard =

English musician (born 1943)

Dennis Leslie Scard (born 8 May 1943) is a former British trade union leader and musician.

Scard grew up in Harrow, London, where he attended the Lascelles County Secondary School. In 1962, he became a professional musician, playing the horn with a variety of orchestras. From 1972 onwards, he also taught music part-time at schools in Hillingdon.

Scard was active in the Musicians' Union (MU), chairing its Central London branch from 1972, and serving on its executive committee from 1979. From 1985, Scard worked full-time for the union, based in Birmingham. He was elected as General Secretary of the MU in 1990, defeating Stan Martin. He was also elected to the General Council of the Trades Union Congress. Under his leadership, membership of the union fell, but its financial position improved, as he merged small branches and ensured that all subscription income came to the National Office before a percentage was returned to branches. The union introduced incentives for young musicians to join, removed its joining fee, and increased insurance coverage and legal services for members. Scard also supported the incoming Labour Party government's Music Industry Forum, of which he was a founding member.

In 2000, Scard was defeated for re-election by Derek Kay, by 4,024 votes to 4,016. From 2002, he served on the Central Arbitration Committee, from 2005 on the Employment Tribunal Service, chaired the Shoreham Port Authority, and also served on the boards of a variety of music organisations.

In the 2000s and 2010s, Scard has stood repeatedly for Eastbourne Borough Council as a Labour Party candidate, and also in the East Sussex County Council election, 2013, but has never been elected.

Trade union offices
Preceded by John Morton	General Secretary of the Musicians' Union; 1990–2000	Succeeded by Derek Kay
