= David Tutt =

British Liberal Democrat politician

Leader of Eastbourne Borough Council
- In office 16 May 2007 – 7 May 2023
- Preceded by: Ian Lucas
- Succeeded by: Stephen Holt

Leader of Liberal Democrats on East Sussex County Council

East Sussex County Councillor
- Incumbent
- Assumed office May 1981

Eastbourne Borough Councillor for St Anthonys
- In office 1 May 1980 – May 2023

Personal details
- Born: David Tutt
- Party: Liberal Democrats

David Tutt is a British Liberal Democrat politician who was the leader of Eastbourne Borough Council between 2007 and 2023, and the leader of the Liberal Democrat group on East Sussex County Council.

== Political offices ==
=== East Sussex County Council ===
Tutt is an elected representative of the people of St. Anthony's Division, at East Sussex County Council. Before the creation of that ward, he was first elected to represent the Priory ward in the same area, in 1981.

He is currently in his tenth term as a County Councilor for that locale in Eastbourne, having served in office for 38 years. This is considered to be a longer than average time, judged against average terms of office for East Sussex County Council and similar tiers of elected government.

=== Eastbourne Borough Council ===
Tutt was first elected to Eastbourne Borough Council, for St. Anthony's Ward, on 1 May 1980. He served as leader of the council twice, firstly for three years in the 1990s and secondly between May 2007 and May 2023.

In 2019, he was re-elected as a councilor with a total of 1,604 votes, from a total electorate in St Anthony's Ward of 8,509 registered voters. He did not stand for re-election to Eastbourne Borough Council in May 2023.

== Redevelopment of Eastbourne ==
As Leader of Eastbourne Borough Council, David Tutt has been the lead democratic official overseeing the redevelopment of the town of Eastbourne. A number of projects have been undertaken in an attempt to regenerate the local economy and tax base, or to make profit-generating investments in the town to remodel the Council's income away from reliance on central government block grants.

=== Devonshire Quarter scheme ===
In June 2017, Tutt attended the official opening of a two-story player's village building, for tennis players at Eastbourne's Devonshire Park tennis grounds. The grounds are host to an annual international tennis tournament. Local council taxes and the Lawn Tennis Association jointly funded the construction of the building, at the direction of Eastbourne Borough Council led by Tutt.

Steve Cresswell, a director of contractors Kier, said of the redevelopment project: "This fantastic project, delivered through the Scape Minor Works framework, will play a key role in the wider £44m (note, officially £54) Devonshire Quarter scheme to provide a top quality sporting, cultural and conference destination in Eastbourne."

Tutt said at the official opening: "The development marks a major part of our work with the LTA to improve the tennis offer here, alongside the £44million transformation underway to put Devonshire Quarter on the map as a first-rate international sporting, cultural and conference destination."
