= Eastbourne Borough Council =

Local government body

Type
- Type: Non-metropolitan district

Leadership
- Mayor: Margaret Bannister, Liberal Democrat since 21 May 2025
- Leader: Stephen Holt, Liberal Democrat since 24 May 2023
- Chief Executive: Robert Cottrill since 28 September 2009 (Note: Has been shared chief executive for both Lewes District Council and Eastbourne Borough Council since January 2016.)

Structure
- Political groups: Administration Liberal Democrat (19) Opposition Conservative (8)

Elections
- Voting system: First past the post
- Last election: 4 May 2023
- Next election: 6 May 2027

Meeting place
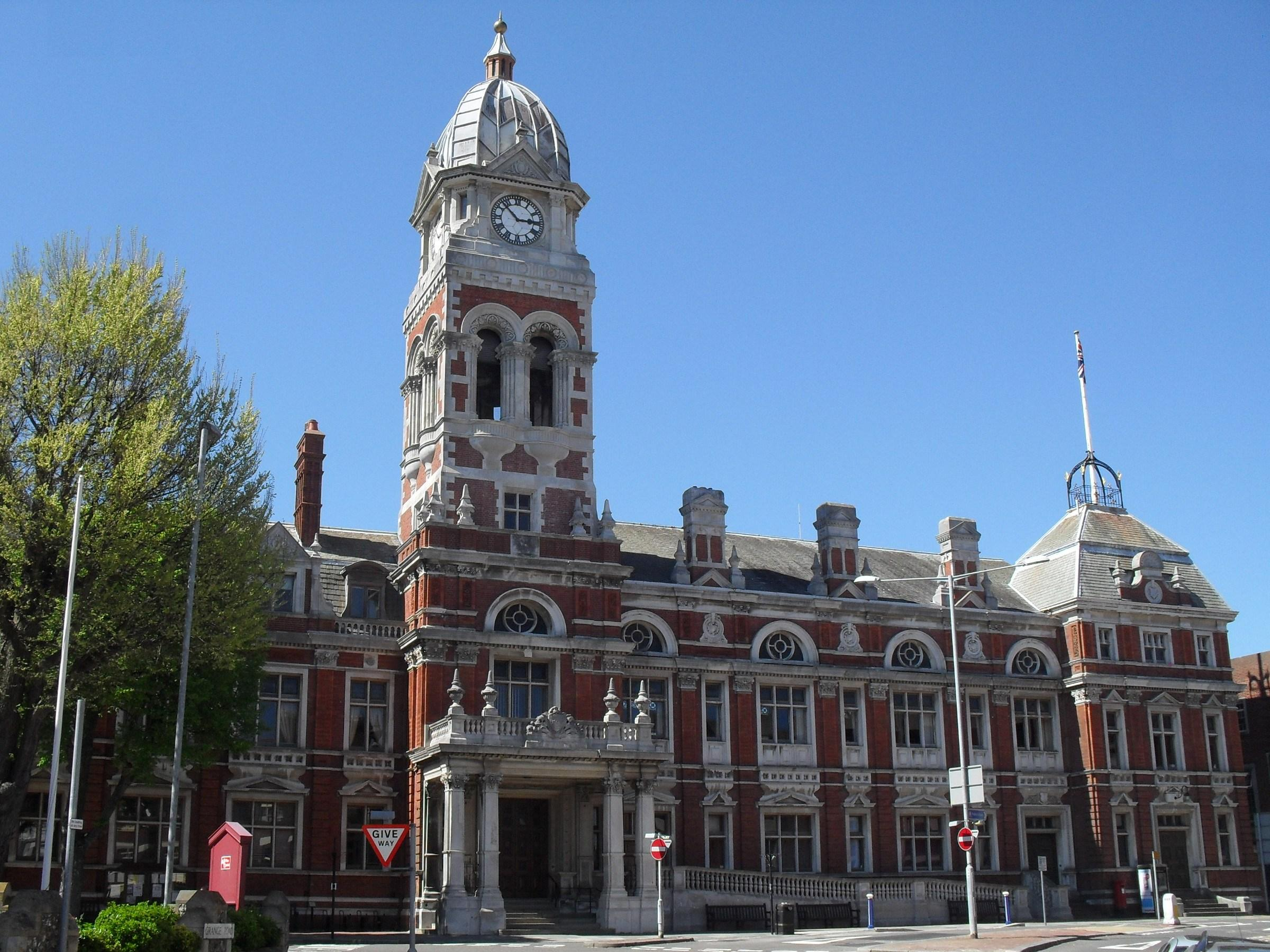
- Town Hall, Grove Road, Eastbourne, BN21 4UG

Website
- www.lewes-eastbourne.gov.uk

Eastbourne Borough Council is the local authority for Eastbourne in East Sussex, England. Eastbourne has had an elected council since 1859, which has been reformed on several occasions. Since 1974, Eastbourne has been a non-metropolitan district with borough status.

The council has been under Liberal Democrat majority control since 2007. It meets at Eastbourne Town Hall and has its main offices at 1 Grove Road.

== History ==
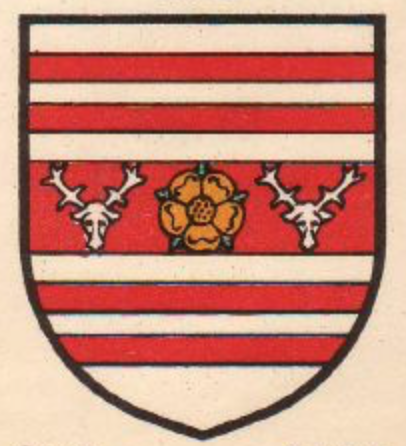
Eastbourne Coat of Arms, a version from 1925

Eastbourne's first elected local authority was a local board, established in 1859 when the ancient parish of Eastbourne was made a local government district. Prior to that the parish had been governed by its vestry, in the same way as most rural areas.

Eastbourne become a municipal borough in 1883, governed by a body formally called the "mayor, aldermen and burgesses of the borough of Eastbourne", but generally known as the corporation or town council. The borough covered a slightly larger area than the previous local government district, also taking in an area known as Norway from the neighbouring parish of Willingdon. In 1911 Eastbourne was elevated to be a county borough, making it independent from East Sussex County Council. The borough was enlarged at the same time to take in the Hampden Park area from Willingdon.

The Eastbourne Corporation Act 1926 allowed the council to purchase the Eastbourne Downland Estate on the west side of the borough, including Beachy Head.

Eastbourne became a non-metropolitan district on 1 April 1974 under the Local Government Act 1972, with East Sussex County Council once more providing county-level services to the town. Eastbourne kept its borough status, allowing the chair of the council to take the title of mayor, continuing Eastbourne's series of mayors dating back to 1883.

Since 2016 the council has shared a chief executive and other staff with nearby Lewes District Council.

== Governance ==
Eastbourne Borough Council provides district-level services. County-level services are provided by East Sussex County Council. There are no civil parishes in the borough, which is an unparished area.

Parts of the borough lie within the South Downs National Park. In those areas, town planning is the responsibility of the South Downs National Park Authority.

=== Political control ===
The council has been under Liberal Democrat majority control since 2007.

Political control of the council since the 1974 reforms has been as follows:

Party in control	Years
Liberal	1974–1976
Conservative	1976–1984
No overall control	1984–1986
Alliance	1986–1988
Conservative	1988–1990
No overall control	1990–1991
Liberal Democrats	1991–1999
No overall control	1999–2000
Conservative	2000–2002
Liberal Democrats	2002–2004
Conservative	2004–2007
Liberal Democrats	2007–present

=== Leadership ===
The role of mayor is largely ceremonial in Eastbourne. Political leadership is instead provided by the leader of the council. The leaders since 1988 have been:

Councillor	Party	From	To
Dennis Cullen	Conservative	May 1988	May 1991
Alan Shuttleworth	Liberal Democrats	May 1991	1993
David Tutt	Liberal Democrats	1993	May 1996
Brian Whitby	Liberal Democrats	May 1996	May 1997
John Ungar	Liberal Democrats	May 1997	1998
Bert Leggett	Liberal Democrats	20 May 1998	May 2000
Graham Marsden	Conservative	May 2000	May 2002
Beryl Healy	Liberal Democrats	15 May 2002	Jun 2004
Graham Marsden	Conservative	23 Jun 2004	18 May 2005
Ian Lucas	Conservative	18 May 2005	May 2007
David Tutt	Liberal Democrats	16 May 2007	May 2023
Stephen Holt	Liberal Democrats	24 May 2023	

=== Composition ===
Following the 2023 election, and subsequent by-elections up to May 2025, the composition of the council was:

Party	Councillors
Liberal Democrats	19
Conservative	8
Total	27

The next election is due in 2027.

== Premises ==
The council meets at the Town Hall on Grove Road. The building was designed by William Tadman Foulkes, and built between 1884 and 1886 under supervision of Henry Currey, the Duke of Devonshire's architect.

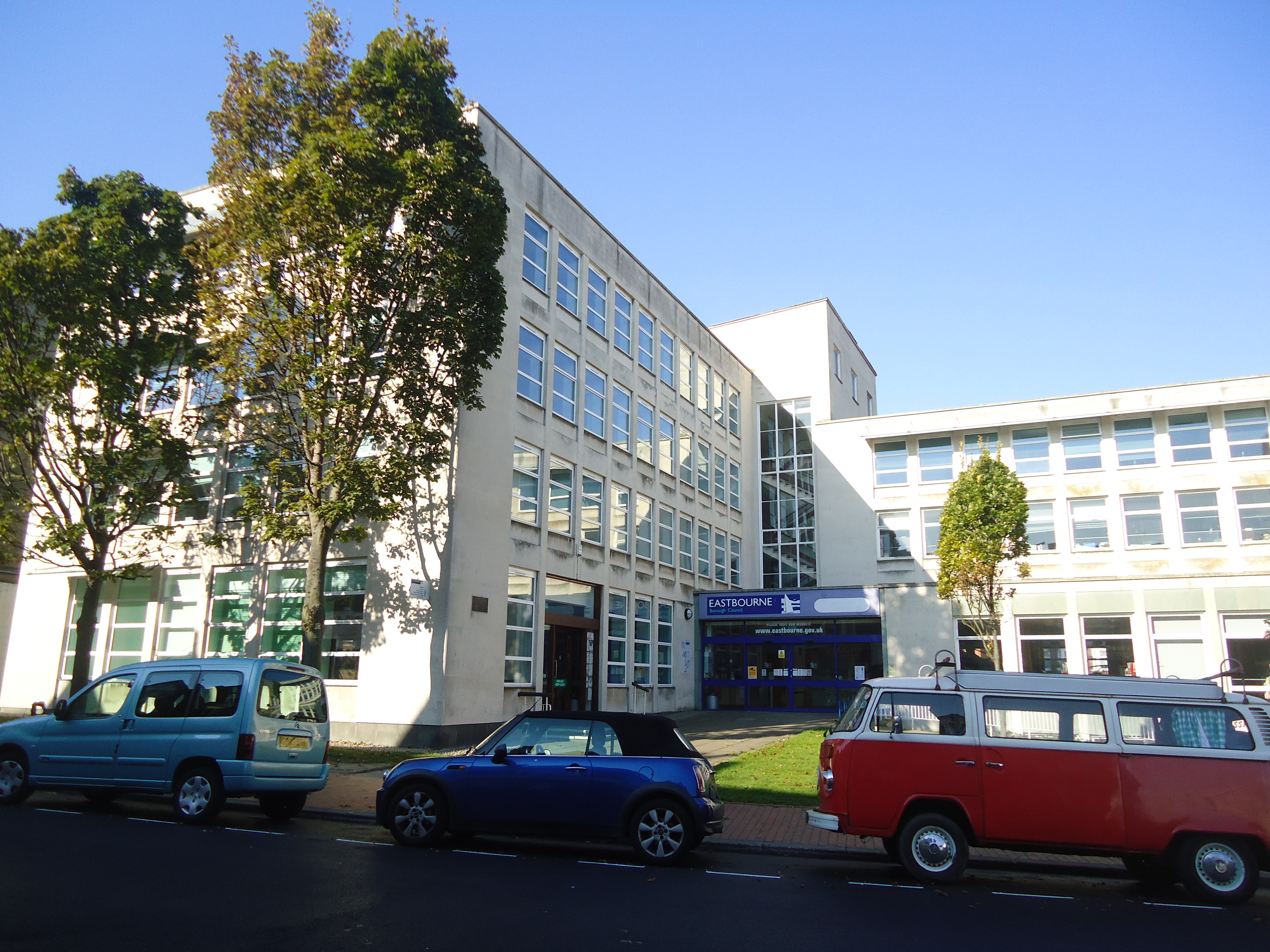
Council's main offices at 1 Grove Road, built 1964.

The council has its main offices nearby at 1 Grove Road, a large building which also includes a library and theatre. That building was completed in 1964 on a site which had been occupied by the previous library and fire station, which were both destroyed in 1943 during the Second World War.

== Elections ==
Since the last boundary changes in 2019 the council has comprised 27 councillors representing 9 wards, with each ward electing three councillors. Elections are held every four years.
