= Cuckmere Haven =

Area of flood plains in Sussex, England

Coordinates: 50.764°N 0.147°E

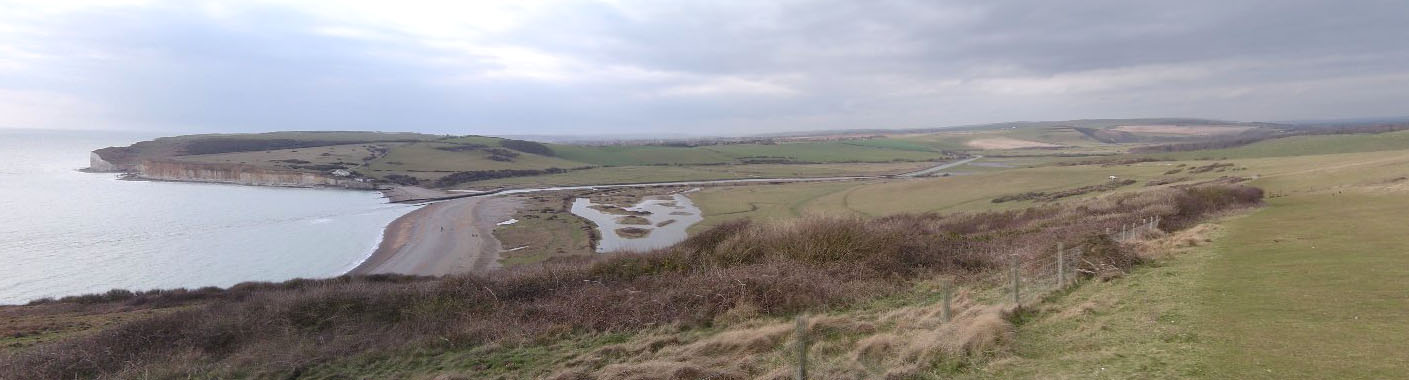
Looking West over Cuckmere Haven

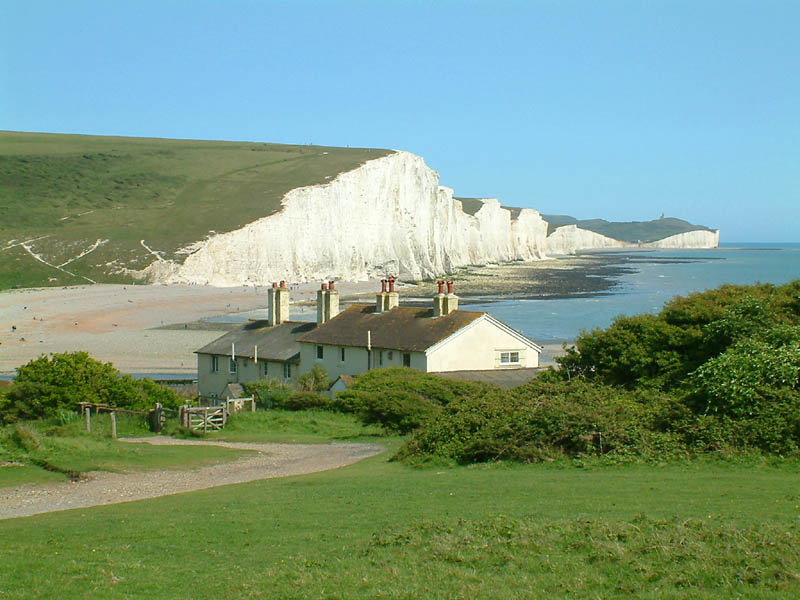
The Seven Sisters cliffs and the coastguard cottages, from Seaford Head showing Cuckmere Haven (looking East).

Cuckmere Haven (also known as the Cuckmere estuary) is an area of flood plains in Sussex, England, where the river Cuckmere meets the English Channel between Eastbourne and Seaford. The river is an example of a meandering river, and contains several oxbow lakes. It is a popular tourist destination with an estimated 350,000 visitors per year, where they can engage in long walks, or water activities on the river. The beach at Cuckmere Haven is next to the famous chalk cliffs, the Seven Sisters.

The wreck of the Polynesia, a German sailing ship that ran aground in April 1890 west of Beachy Head laden with a cargo of sodium nitrate, is exposed at low tide.

== History ==
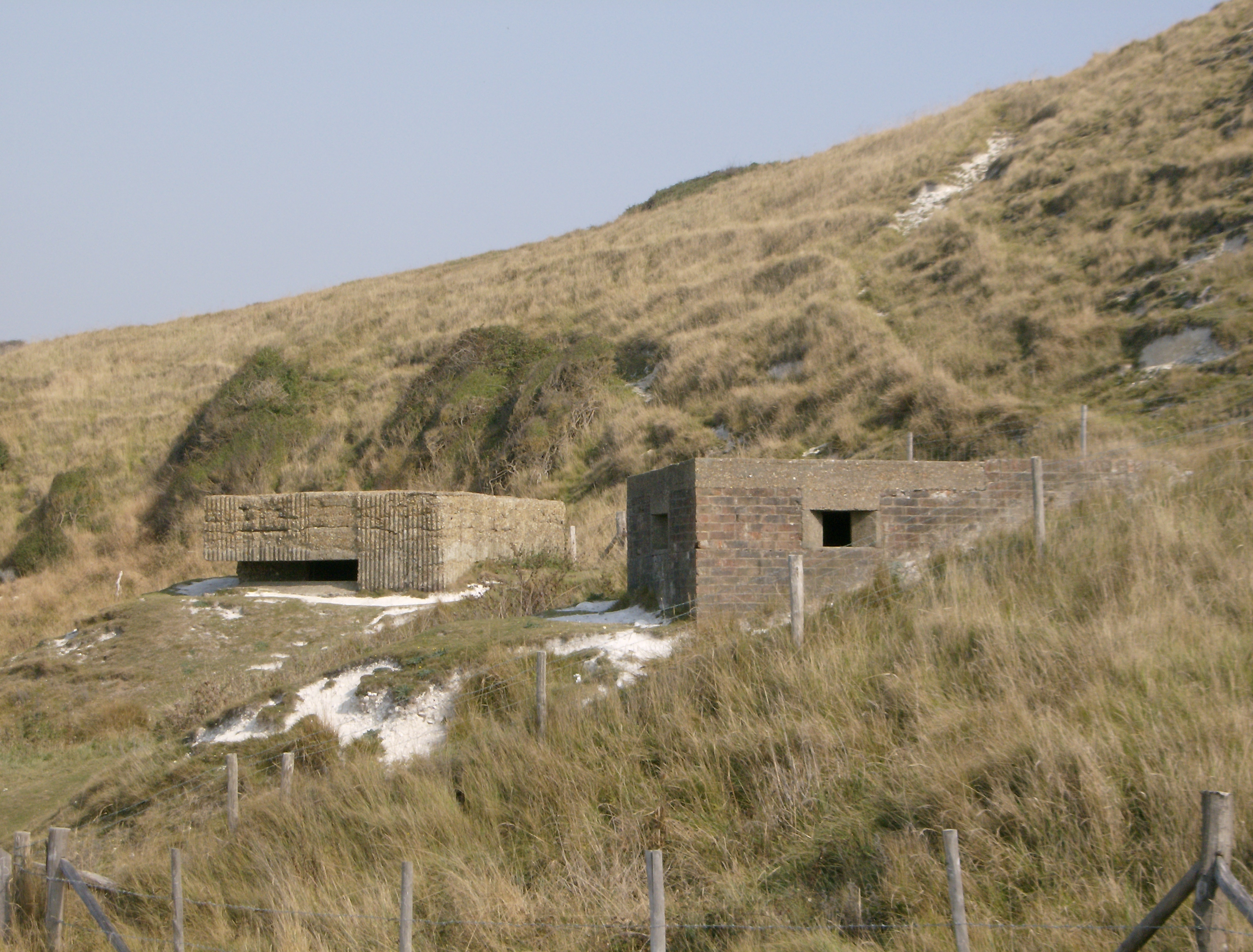
World War II defences at Cuckmere Haven

The beach was commonly used by smugglers in the 16th, 17th, and 18th centuries. For example, in 1783 two gangs of smugglers (each numbering 200 or 300) overcame officers of the law by weight of numbers and carried away a large quantity of goods.

In the Second World War, the site was studied by the Luftwaffe as they flew missions to identify potential landing sites for the invasion of the UK mainland. As a result, the British constructed a series of counter-landing defences, of which numerous pillboxes, anti-tank obstacles, ditches and tank traps survive. Admiralty scaffolding blocked the inlet, but is now gone. Cuckmere Haven featured heavily in the war effort: at night lights were placed to confuse bombers into thinking they were above Newhaven and an airfield was set up further inland. In addition to the permanent land-based constructions, the river was heavily mined.

The East Sussex Transport and Trading Company extracted gravel from the beach at Cuckmere Haven. It transported the material to the road at Exceat on a 2-foot (610 mm) gauge tramway a mile (1.6 km) long, established in the early 1930s and closed in 1964. The tramway began in what is now the car park on the southern side of the main road. The footpath to Cuckmere Haven (east of the river) follows the line of the tramway.

== Settlements within the park ==
Two hamlets, Exceat and Foxhole, are in the park, along with a small group of cottages on the cliff edge (known as the coastguard cottages) – these are mostly kept as holiday homes. Next to the Friston Forest car park, Exceat is a group of farm buildings with facilities and a café. There is also a tiny old shepherd's caravan. The name Exceat derives from the old English word for "exit"; the hamlet was an exit for people sailing out to the Channel. Foxhole is made up of another group of agricultural buildings, with a large pond at the centre. The two houses are home to the Seven Sisters Country Park rangers, and one barn has been converted to a camping barn, with an adjacent field for camping. This is known as Foxhole Campsite, and is useful for South Downs Way walkers. It would appear Foxhole Campsite is no longer open for public use. has been updated to this effect, although the advice mentioned herein previously is still on the site.

== Coastguard cottages ==
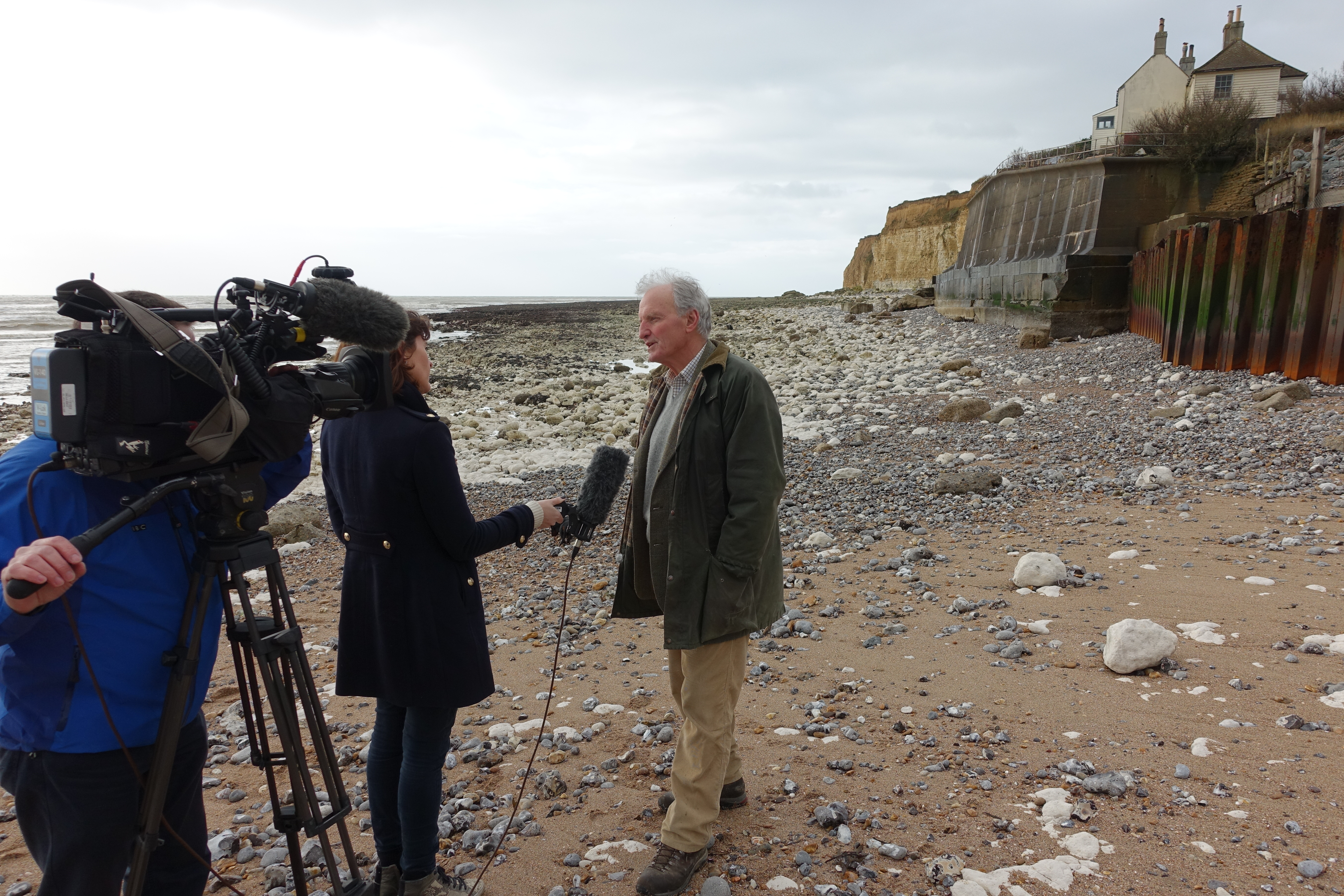
BBC Interview with a Cuckmere Haven SOS representative in February 2016

The coastguard cottages at Cuckmere Haven were built shortly after the National Coastguard Service was founded in 1822. Prior to this Cuckmere Haven was an important place for smuggling. The cliff face in front of the cottages has since retreated by more than 30 metres due to coastal erosion. This combined with the loss of shingle from the beach below the cottages due to wave action in storms has put the cottages in danger. A fundraising campaign has been created to protect these iconic buildings.

== Wildlife and ecosystem ==
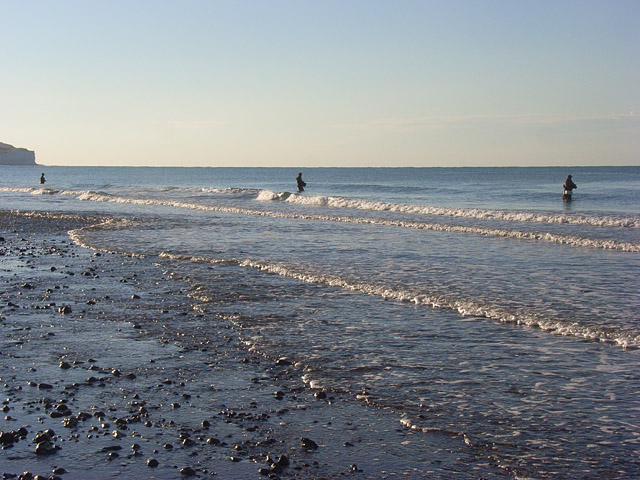
Anglers, in the sea where the River Cuckmere reaches its destination. To the left is the headland at Belle Tout.

Cuckmere Haven is home to a large variety of wildlife, and has a rich ecosystem. Sheep and cattle graze, keeping the fields at a constant vegetation level. Woodpigeons and rooks pick at the stubble, and aquatic birds such as oystercatchers forage in the water meadows. The result is a fertile area of land providing varied habitats. The beaches are made up of shingle and there are rock pools along the shoreline at low tide.

From 2019, the entire coastline of the South Downs National Park is a Marine Conservation Zone.

=== Fish ===
- The short-snouted seahorse

=== Reptiles ===
- Adder
- Barred grass snake
- Slowworm

=== Mammals ===
- Badger
- Rabbits live in the sandy banks by the main path
- Red fox
- Domestic cattle (largely young bullocks) and sheep, mainly owned by Foxhole Farm, graze all round the park. Visitors are requested to keep dogs under close control at all times.

=== Birds ===
- Black-headed gull
- Brent goose
- Canada goose
- Carrion crow
- Common sandpiper
- Northern fulmars nest on the cliffs in summer; although not as common as the herring gulls, they can easily be spotted from the beach.
- Green woodpecker
- Grey heron
- Grey wagtail
- Greylag goose
- Herring gull
- Jackdaw
- Kestrel
- Little egrets had their first stronghold here at Cuckmere Haven and nest on the marshy area by the beach with the herons, with which they often forage.
- Little grebe
- Meadow pipit
- Oystercatcher
- Pied wagtail
- Common pochard
- Common redshank
- Reed bunting
- Ringed plover
- Rook
- Raven
- Sand martins nest in the burrows they build in the sand banks by the path in summer
- Shelduck
- Short-eared owl
- Skylarks tend to stay on the hills to the east of the river, where they nest in the long grass and rise up to sing.
- Stonechat
- Swallow
- Wigeon
- Woodpigeon

== In popular culture ==
Cuckmere Haven has been used as the setting for all or part of a number of films and TV programmes including Robin Hood: Prince of Thieves, Harry Potter and the Goblet of Fire, Atonement, Corruption, Green Wing, Foyle's War, Mr. Holmes, Summerland, Agatha Christie's Poirot, Luther, Wicked, as well as a music video for Cheryl Cole's song The Flood.
