= Beachy Head Lighthouse =

Lighthouse at Beachy Head, East Sussex, England

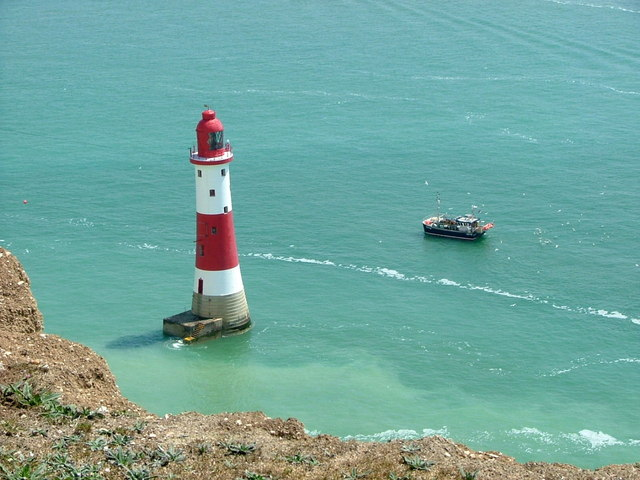
- Location: Eastbourne; East Sussex; England
- OS grid: TV5827495078
- Coordinates: 50°44′1.5″N 0°14′29.4″E

Tower
- Constructed: 1902
- Foundation: concrete base
- Construction: granite tower
- Automated: 1983
- Height: 33 m (108 ft)
- Shape: tapered cylindrical with balcony and lantern
- Markings: white tower with a broad horizontal red band, red lantern
- Operator: Trinity House
- Heritage: Grade II listed building
- Fog signal: blast every 30s. (Discontinued 2011)

Light
- Focal height: 31 m (102 ft)
- Lens: First Order 920 mm Asymmetrical Catadioptric rotating optic (original); Single-tier LED lantern (current)
- Range: 16 nmi (30 km; 18 mi)
- Characteristic: Fl (2) W 20s.

Beachy Head Lighthouse is a lighthouse located in the English Channel below the cliffs of Beachy Head in East Sussex. It is 33 m (108 ft) in height and became operational in October 1902. It was the last wave-washed masonry lighthouse built by Trinity House.

== Construction ==
Beachy Head Lighthouse was built to replace the Belle Tout Lighthouse (which was completed in 1834) on top of the cliffs of Beachy Head. The Belle Tout lighthouse was not as successful as had been hoped, as its light was frequently obscured by sea mists. Thus it was decided to build a replacement at the foot of the cliffs. Belle Tout lighthouse was decommissioned in 1902, and still exists as a holiday home.

From 1900 to 1902, under the direction of Sir Thomas Matthews, the Trinity House Engineer-in-Chief, Beachy Head Lighthouse was built, sited about 165 metres seawards from the base of the cliffs. For the construction, a temporary cable car from the cliff was installed for the transport of workers and stones to an iron ocean platform adjacent to the lighthouse. 3,660 tons of Cornish granite were used in the construction of the tower.

The lighthouse was equipped with a first-order revolving catadioptric optic made up of three double panels, giving two white flashes every 20 seconds; the lightsource was a Matthews-designed paraffin vapour burner. The newly built lighthouse was also provided with an explosive fog signal, which was sounded every five minutes in foggy weather; it involved the keepers attaching a small explosive charge together with a detonator to each arm of a jib located on the gallery of the lighthouse; when winched into place, connection was made with a dynamo-electric firing machine inside the lantern, from where the charge was remotely fired.

The new lighthouse began operation on 2 October 1902. Initially, the granite tower was painted with a broad black band around its middle, and the lantern and gallery were likewise painted black; the colour was altered to red in 1951.

== Operation ==
For more than 80 years, the tower was staffed by three lighthouse keepers. Their primary job was to maintain the revolving light, which was then visible 26 nautical miles (48 km; 30 mi) out to sea. For most of the 20th century cooking was done on a solid-fuel range and the accommodation was lit by paraffin lamps. Electricity first reached the lighthouse in 1975, whereupon an electric lamp was installed in the optic. The explosive fog signal remained in use until 1976 (when it was replaced by an 'ELG 500' electric emitter); at the time Beachy Head was one of the last lighthouses still using explosive signals. The lighthouse was fully automated in 1983 and the keepers withdrawn.

A chalk fall on the cliff in 1999 severed the electric cable; during its repair the lamp and fog signal were replaced and upgraded. In June 2010, Trinity House announced in the five yearly "Aids To Navigation Review" that the light range would be reduced to 8 nmi (15 km; 9.2 mi) and the fog signal discontinued. In February 2011, this work was undertaken: a new LED navigation light system was installed and the fog signal was decommissioned. The old lens, though no longer in use, was left in situ in the lighthouse (the new LED lanterns having been mounted on the gallery outside). The fog signal was also discontinued at this time.

Trinity House announced in 2011 that it could no longer afford to repaint the distinctive red and white stripes and that it would have to be left to return to its natural granite grey. It stated that because boats now have high tech navigational systems the day marker stripes are no longer essential. However, a sponsored campaign to keep the stripes was launched in October 2011. The required £27,000 was raised. The tower repainting was completed in October using a team including two abseilers. Five coats of paint were applied to the copper lantern at the top and three on each hoop of the tower.

In 2018, with the impending demolition of the Royal Sovereign Lighthouse, Trinity House undertook work to increase the strength of Beachy Head light to compensate for the loss of Royal Sovereign; the work involved increasing the number of solar panels, which are positioned around the base of the gallery, and installing a more powerful LED lantern, giving a new nominal range for the light of 16 nautical miles (30 km; 18 mi).

== Gallery ==
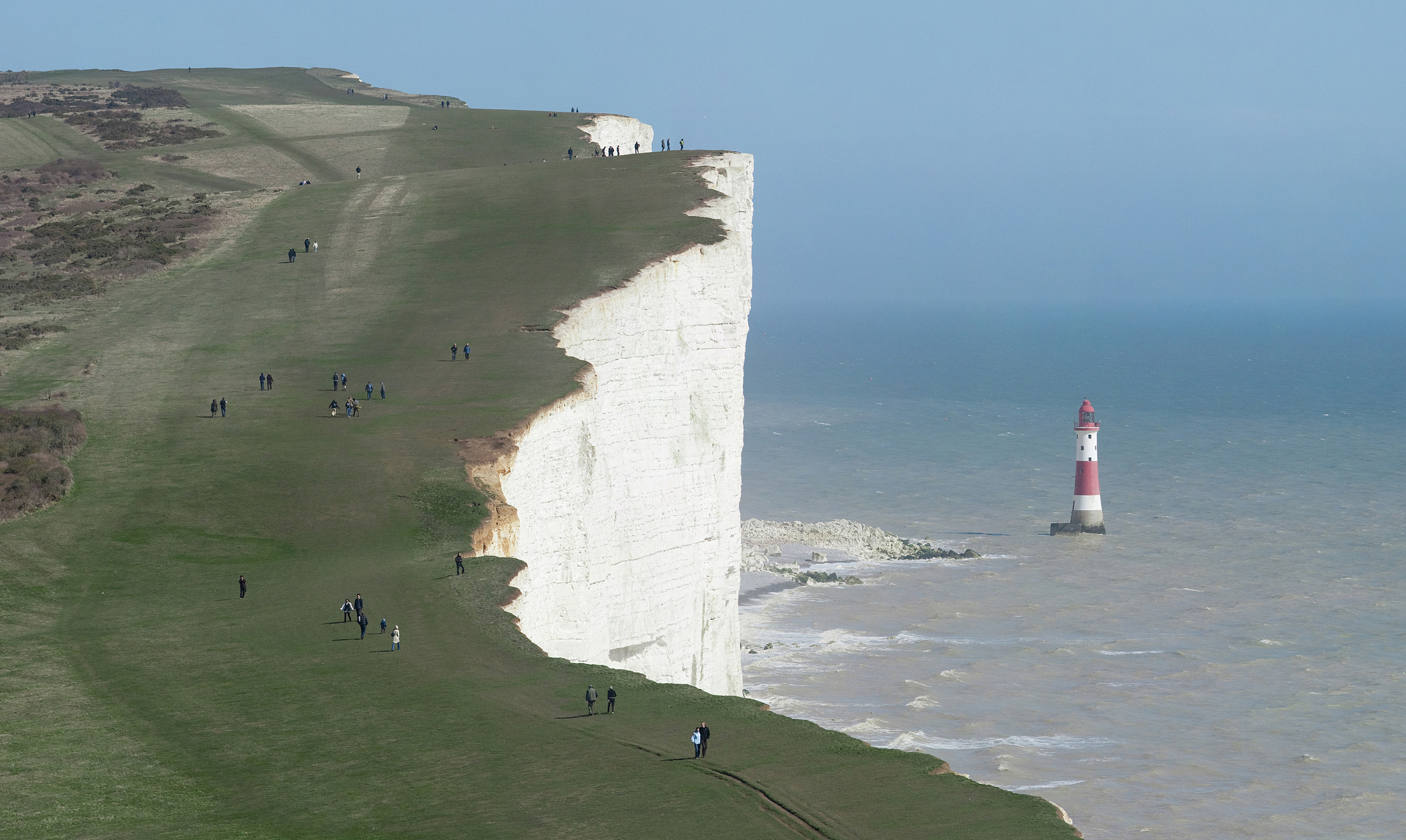
Looking towards the cliffs and lighthouse from the west near Birling Gap

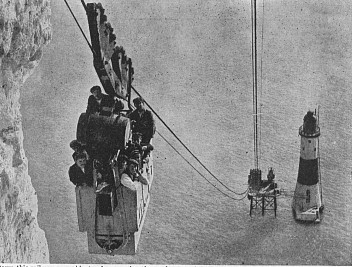
Temporary cable car for the construction of the lighthouse

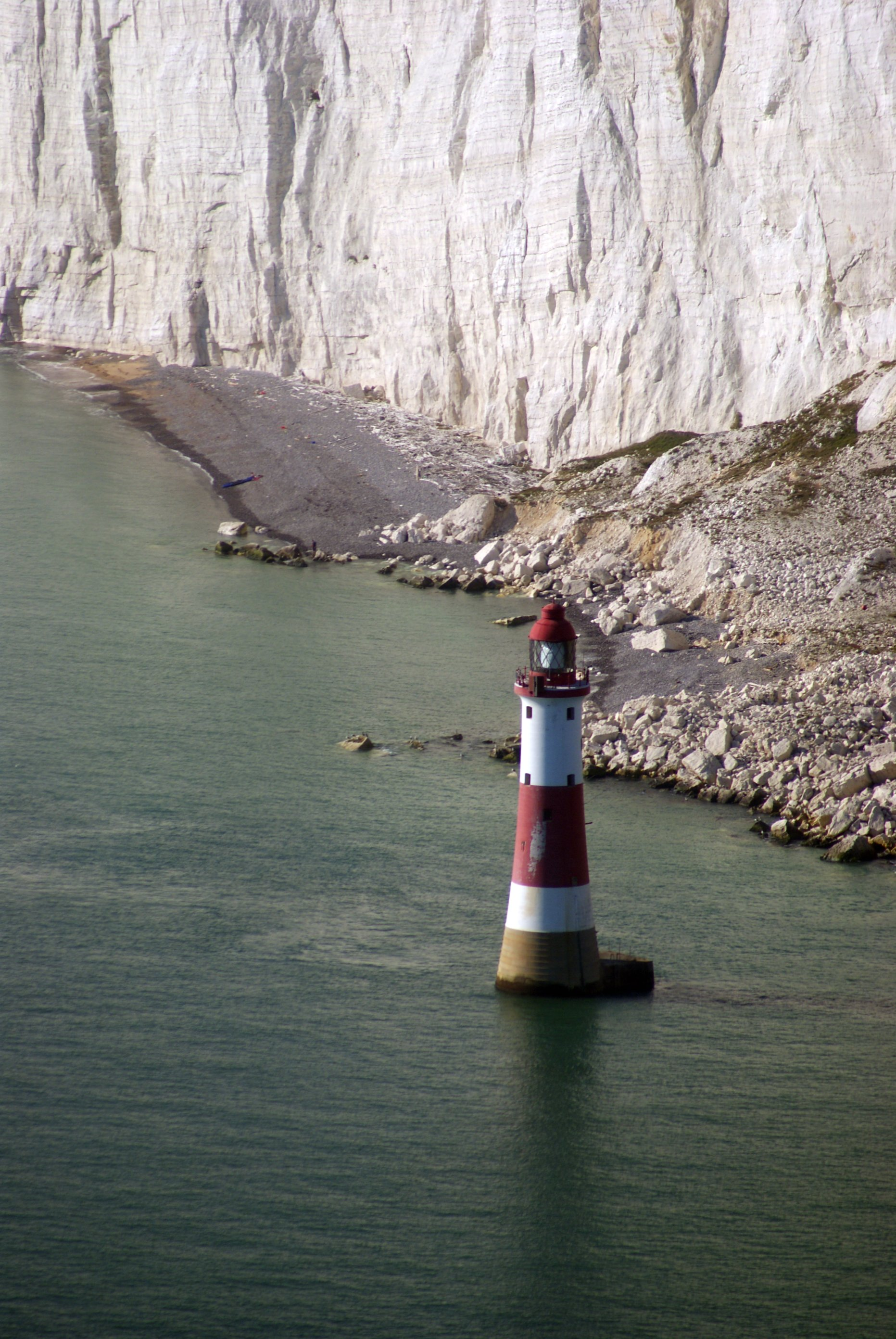
The lighthouse from the sea

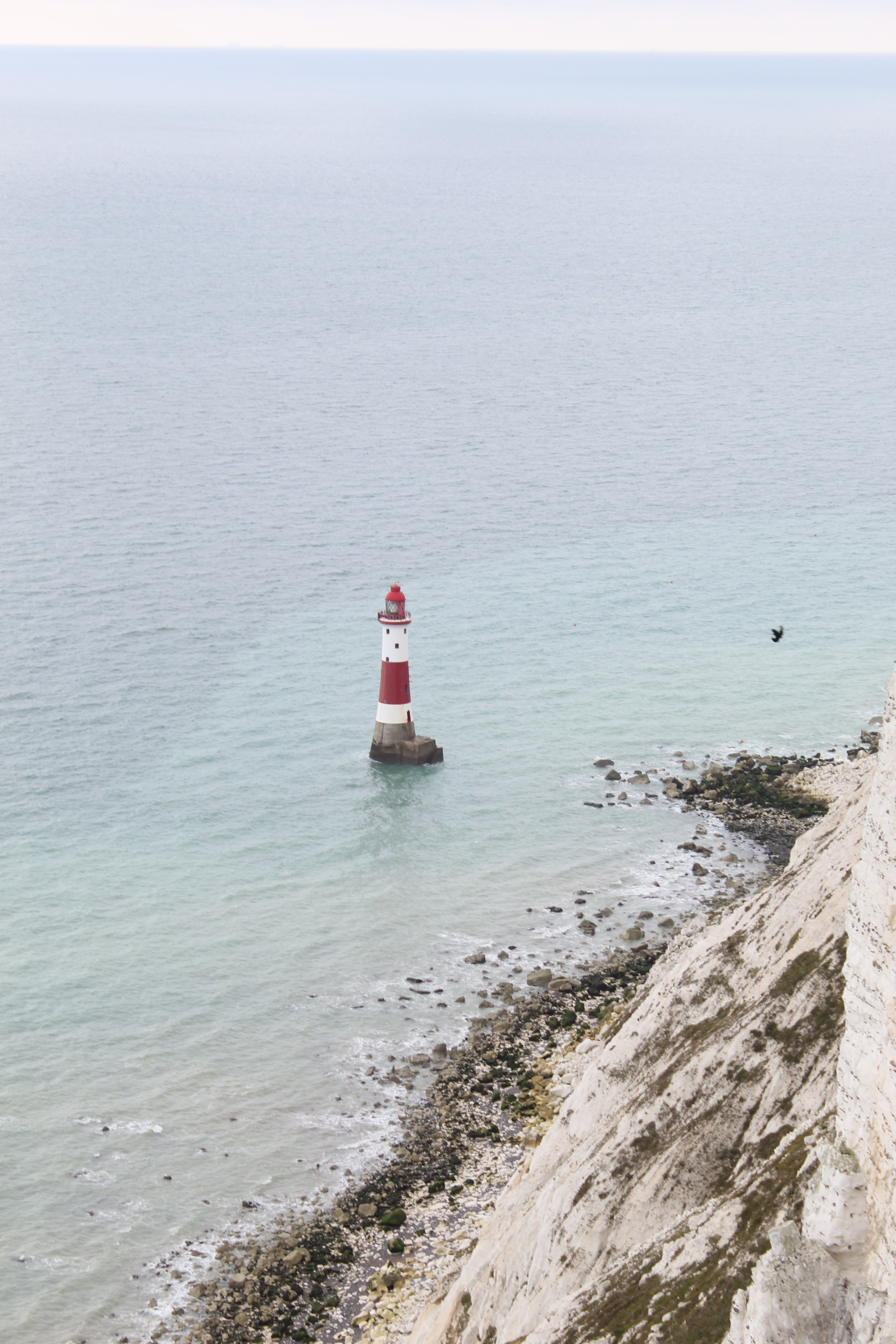
The lighthouse viewed from the east side

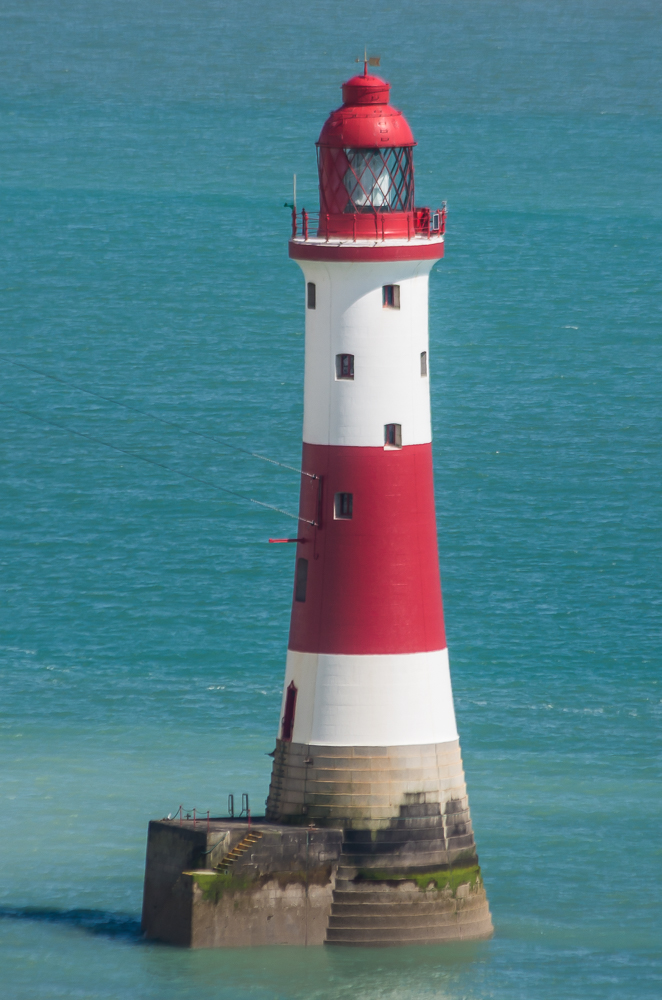
Detail of the lighthouse

== In popular culture ==
The lighthouse was seen in episodes of The Prisoner: The Girl Who Was Death and Many Happy Returns.

The lighthouse was shown in the 1968 film, Chitty Chitty Bang Bang after the car falls off the cliff and flies for the first time.

== See also ==
- List of lighthouses in England
