= Seven Sisters, East Sussex =

Series of chalk cliffs in Sussex, United Kingdom

Coordinates: 50.76°N 0.16°E

Seven Sisters
- Chalk sea cliffs
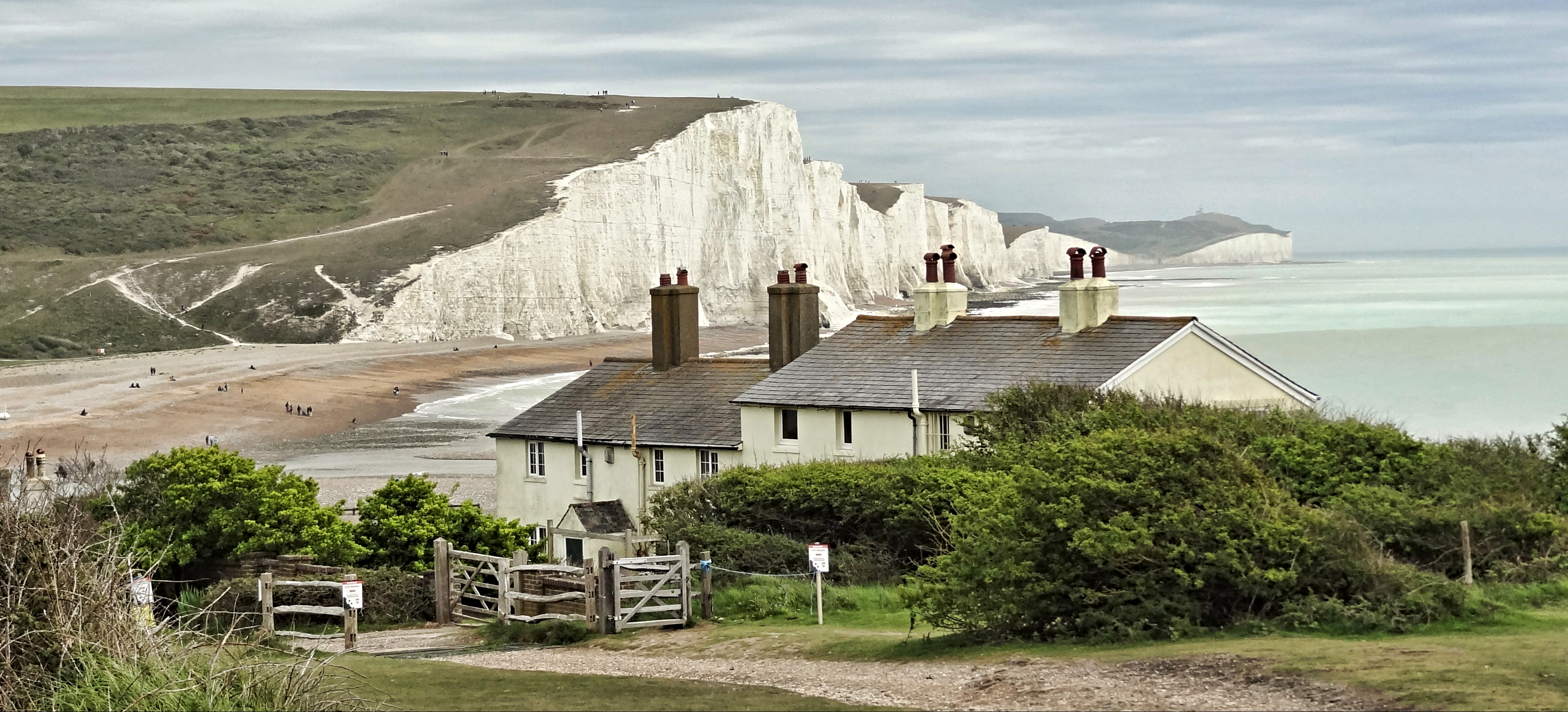
- The Seven Sisters seen from Seaford Head across Cuckmere Haven
- Interactive map of Seven Sisters

The Seven Sisters are a series of chalk sea cliffs on the English Channel coast, and are a stretch of the sea-eroded section of the South Downs range of hills, in the county of East Sussex, in south-east England. The Seven Sisters cliffs run between the mouth of the River Cuckmere near Seaford, and the chalk headland of Beachy Head outside of Eastbourne. The dips or swales that separate each of the seven crests from the next are the remnants of dry valleys in the chalk South Downs which are being gradually eroded by the sea.

Some of the cliffs and adjacent countryside make up the Seven Sisters Country Park, which is bounded on its inland side by the A259 road, and is itself a part of the larger South Downs National Park.

== History ==
Up until the 1400s, a village, Exceat, sat where the visitor centre is now. In the Saxon times it was a fishing village and one of King Alfred's naval bases. When it was struck by the bubonic plague, the village was abandoned. A single stone from the village's church is the only remnant.

In 1926 plans emerged for the construction of a new town on the cliffs above the Seven Sisters, initiated by a little-known group of property developers. The proposal threatened one of the few remaining undeveloped stretches of the south-coast landscape. A coalition of early conservationists—including members of the Society of Sussex Downsmen, poet Rudyard Kipling, a bereaved mother of a First World War soldier, and several notable public figures—mobilised to oppose the scheme. Opponents were given just one month to raise £17,000 (approximately £509,000 in modern values) to purchase the land and prevent development. The fundraising campaign succeeded, allowing the group to buy out the developers and secure the cliffs for public benefit. This effort ensured the preservation of the Seven Sisters coastline for future generations.

== Cliffs ==
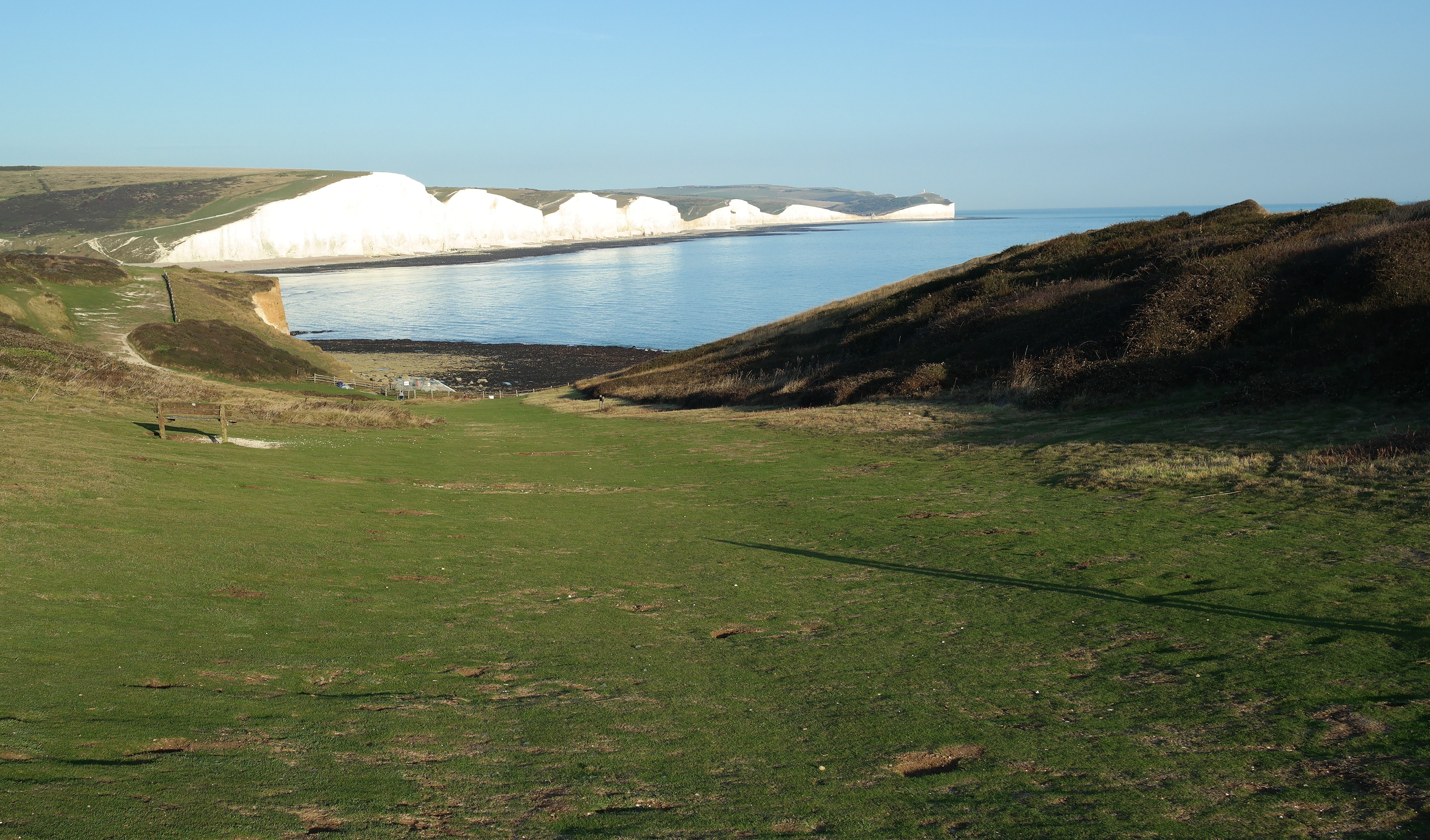
Seven Sisters as seen from Seaford Head Nature Reserve, 2025

From west to east, the sequence starts just east of Cuckmere Haven. The cliff peaks and the dips between them are individually named. Listed below, the peaks are in italics. There are seven hills, with an eighth one being created by the erosion of the sea.

- Haven Brow (grid reference TV524976)
- Short Bottom (grid reference TV526974)
- Short Brow (grid reference TV528974)
- Limekiln Bottom (grid reference TV531974)
- Rough Brow (grid reference TV532972)
- Rough Bottom
- Brass Point
- Gap Bottom
- Flagstaff Point (continuing into Flagstaff Brow)
- Flagstaff Bottom
- Flat Hill
- Flathill Bottom
- Baily's Hill
- Michel Dean (grid reference TV549967)
- Went Hill Brow (grid reference TV549963)

Just east of the last peak is Birling Gap. Beyond, on the top of the next hill, is Belle Tout Lighthouse and beyond that Beachy Head. A lighthouse in the sea marks the latter headland.

The South Downs Way runs along the edge of the cliffs, taking a very undulating course. Many landmarks around the area are named after the cliffs, including the Seven Sisters Sheep Centre.

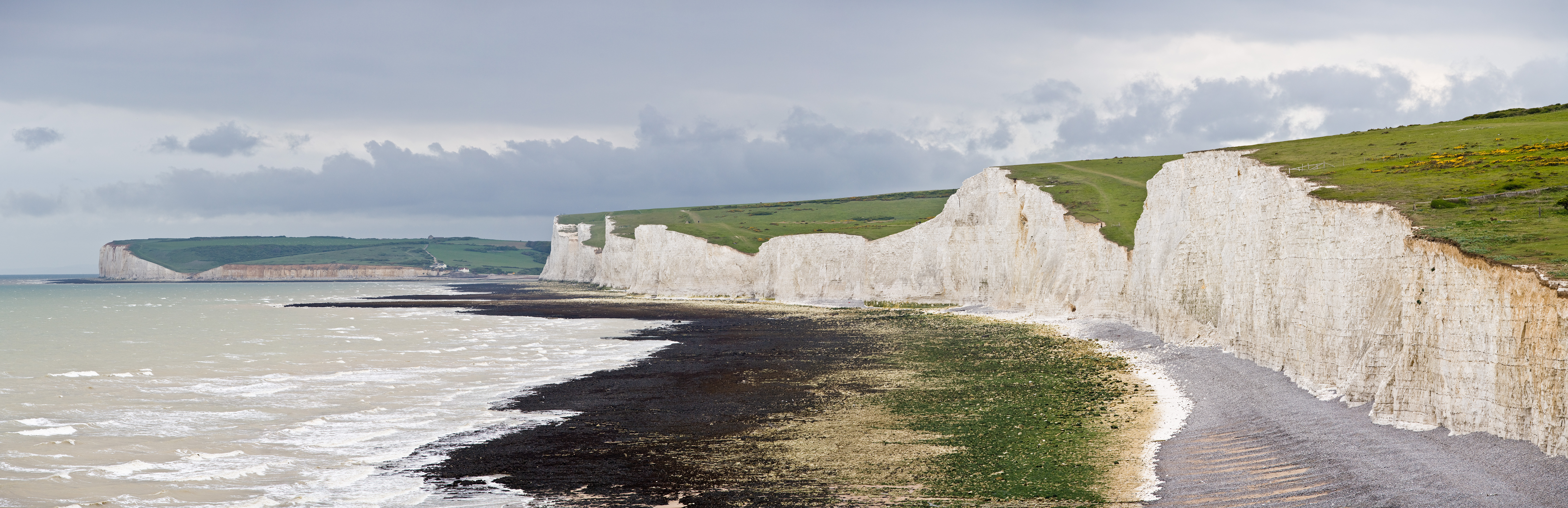
A panoramic view of all seven sisters from the Beachy Head cliffs near Birling Gap, looking back towards the River Cuckmere and Seaford Head in the background

== Film and television ==
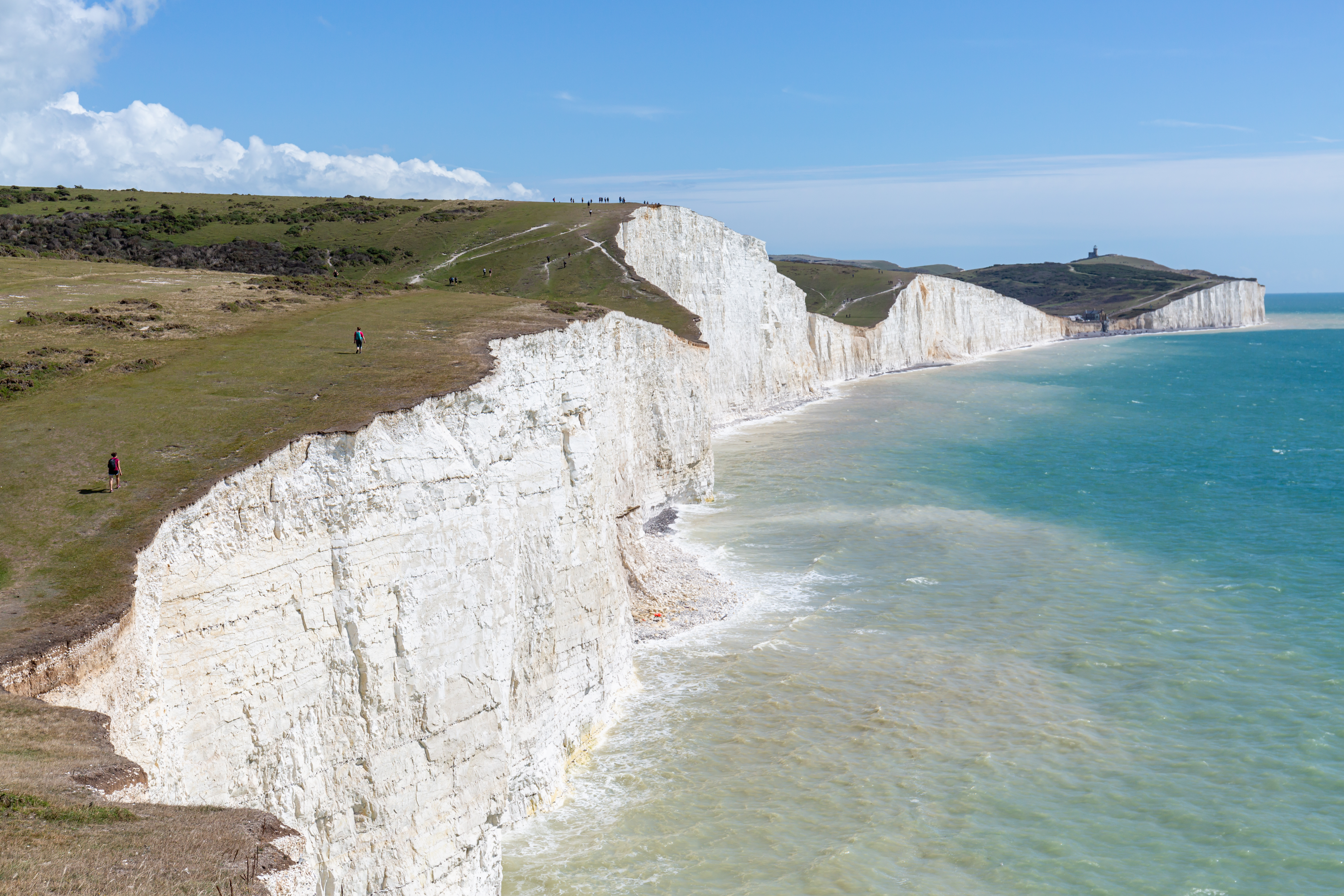
The eastern portion of the Seven Sisters

The Seven Sisters cliffs are occasionally used in filmmaking and television production as a stand-in for the more famous White Cliffs of Dover, since they are relatively free of anachronistic modern development and are also allowed to erode naturally. As a result, the Seven Sisters and Beachy Head remain a bright white colour, whereas the White Cliffs of Dover are protected due to the important port and are therefore increasingly covered in vegetation and are greening as a result. They are also featured at the beginning of the film Robin Hood: Prince of Thieves, and at the end of the film Atonement where Robbie and Cecilia always wanted to live.

The Seven Sisters are seen in the background of the Quidditch World Cup in the 2005 film Harry Potter and the Goblet of Fire, and also when Slartibartfast is showing Arthur Dent the "new" Earth in The Hitchhiker's Guide to the Galaxy, released the same year.

Much of the 2015 feature film Mr. Holmes was filmed around the Seven Sisters. The Seven Sisters is also featured in first episode of Season 3 of AMC series of The Walking Dead: Daryl Dixon.

The 2019 film Hope Gap, starring Bill Nighy and Annette Bening was against the backdrop of Seaford Head. The film is named after the distinctive area of chalk cliff between Seaford and Cuckmere Haven. In 2020, Jessica Swale's feature film debut Summerland premiered, shot around the Seaford area, featuring numerous views of the Seven Sisters.

The Netflix series Anatomy of a Scandal had shots of the Seven Sisters Cliffs that featured Sienna Miller and Rupert Friend.

The White Cliffs are featured on the cover of the Bill Bryson book The Road to Little Dribbling. They also feature in Wicked (2024) as the entrance to Shiz University.
