= Seven Sisters Sheep Centre =

Coordinates: 50.752°N 0.207°E

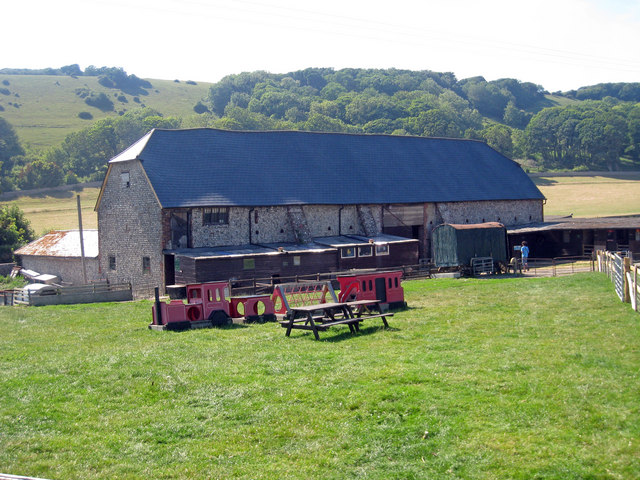
The Sheep Centre in July 2008

The Seven Sisters Sheep Centre was a farm near East Dean, in the Seven Sisters Country Park of the South Downs in England. It held a large collection of about 50 sheep breeds, including rare breeds no longer raised by commercial farmers, and a number of Southdown sheep.

Other animals on display include goats, pigs, rabbits, guinea pigs, cats, geese and ducks, a cow, a Shetland pony, and a donkey.

Wigmore founded the Centre in 1987 when the estate for which he worked as a livestock manager closed off its livestock operations. He bought 120 of their sheep and began his own business. Wigmore says: "We used to lamb the estate ewes through these yards, and every weekend there would be loads of people looking over the gate, trying to see in. I thought I might make a living inviting them in. The next year we started doing tours, then I decided to make it a full-blown tourist attraction."

It closed in 2016.
