= 2017 Birling Gap incident =

Suspected gas leak

On 27 August 2017, Beachy Head and beaches including Birling Gap, in the English county of East Sussex, were evacuated following a suspected chemical leak. Visitors reported ill effects after the appearance of a "mist", and 233 people were treated at Eastbourne General Hospital, initially with a full chemical decontamination. Witnesses reported stinging and dried-up eyes, regardless of repeated eyewashes.

The identity of the gas was unclear, but chlorine was initially blamed. East Sussex Fire and Rescue Service stated that "due to the symptoms and situation described", the gas was unlikely to be chlorine. Previous chemical emission clouds had drifted across from industrial units in Northern France; however, the Maritime and Coastguard Agency (MCA) stated that in this incident such a scenario was unlikely due to weather models. The MCA said that one line of investigation was a possible leak from a disturbed shipwreck, with the SS Mira, a 3,700-tonne First World War armed tanker sunk by a German mine on 11 October 1917, suggested as one potential source. Investigators from the MCA also looked at some 180 ships that passed through the area on 27 August 2017.

In 2018 BBC Sussex requested police, fire, and ambulance logs under a freedom of information request. The National Police Air Service and Ministry of Defence were asked to help but said their aircraft could not fly in the circumstances. Helicopters could not be used to investigate the haze in case the gas was explosive. East Sussex Fire Service used gas detection equipment, but could not detect anything as the cloud had dispersed.

== Reaction ==
Caroline Lucas, the Green Party MP for Brighton Pavilion, called for an urgent inquiry to determine the cause.

== Defra report ==
A report conducted by Defra into the incident was inconclusive as to the precise source of the release due to the absence of samples to determine the chemicals involved. The report did rule out land-based sources in either England or France but suggested that the cloud most likely originated from a ship, wreck, or lost cargo in the English Channel.
