= East Dean and Friston =

Parish in East Sussex, England

Coordinates: 50.76°N 0.20°E

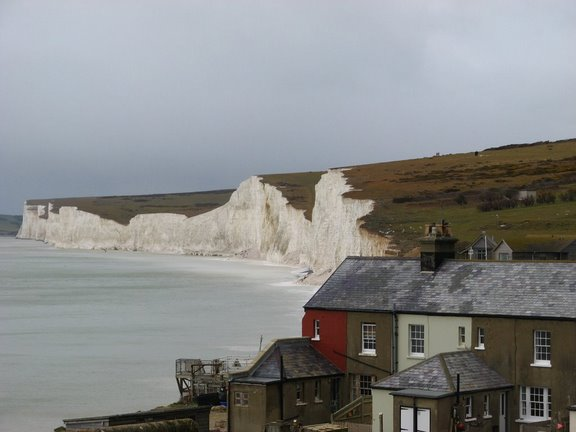
- Seven Sisters from Birling Gap

- Location within East Sussex
- Area: 3.3 sq mi (8.5 km^{2})
- Population: 1,599 (2021)
  - Density: 475/sq mi (183/km^{2})
- OS grid reference: TV552983
  - London: 53 miles (85 km) NNW
- District: Wealden
- Shire county: East Sussex
- Region: South East
- Country: England
- Sovereign state: United Kingdom
- Post town: EASTBOURNE
- Postcode district: BN20
- Dialling code: 01323
- Police: Sussex
- Fire: East Sussex
- Ambulance: South East Coast
- UK Parliament: Lewes
- Website: http://eastdeanvillage.org.uk/

East Dean and Friston is a civil parish in the Wealden District of East Sussex, England.The two villages in the parish are in a dry valley on the South Downs – between Eastbourne three miles (4.8 km) to the east and Seaford an equal distance to the west. The main A259 road goes through both village centres. The coast and much of the land between it and the A259 from the east edge of Seaford to the west edge of Eastbourne is owned by the National Trust, and this has prevented further development to the area. The civil parish was formed on 1 April 1999 from "East Dean" and "Friston" parishes.

A hamlet within the parish, Birling Gap, is owned by the National Trust. Some of its cottages have been demolished due to coastal erosion.

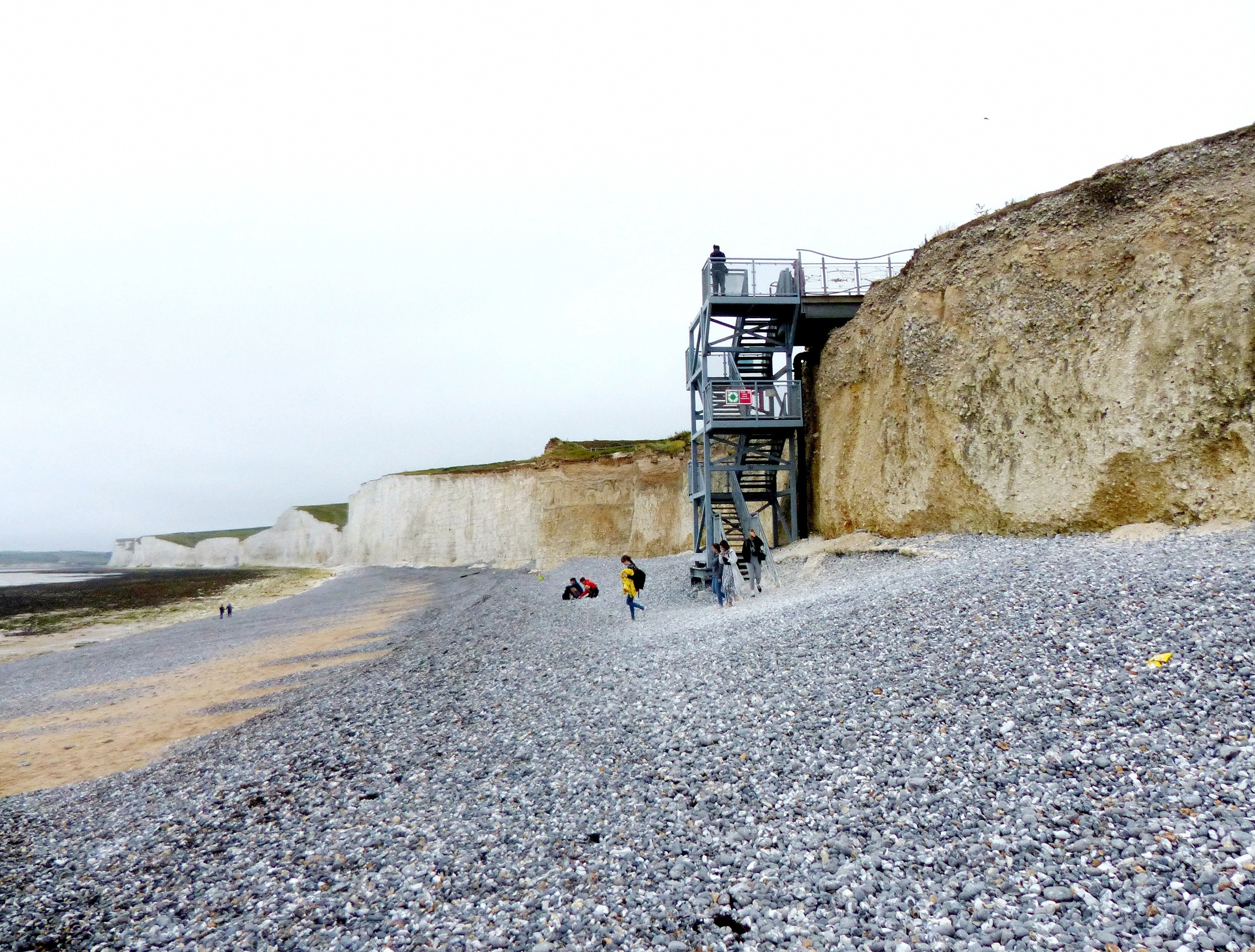
Steps to Birling Gap beach (2018)

The population as of 2021 census is 1,599, down from 1,620 in 2011.

== Governance ==
East Dean and Friston, which has its own parish council, is part of the electoral ward called East Dean. This ward had a population at the 2011 Census of 2,258.

The villages are both part of Lewes and have been represented by James MacCleary since the 2024 United Kingdom general election, when he defeated the incumbent Maria Caulfield.

== The Villages ==
East Dean lies in the valley bottom, while Friston is at the top of the hill to the west. Within both villages are a large number of buildings of historic interest.

The church in East Dean, dedicated to St Simon and St Jude, has a Saxon tower and an unusual Tapsel gate (preventing cattle from entering the churchyard); that at Friston is dedicated to St Mary the Virgin. The churches have formed a united benefice since 1688. The latter contains Tudor monuments to the local family Selwyn and the grave of the composer Frank Bridge (1879–1941).

== Demographics ==
According to the 2021 United Kingdom census, the two villages combined have a population of 1,599, down from 1,620 in 2011, an increase from 1,578 in 2001.

=== Birthplace ===
In 2021, 91.4% (1,463) of the population were born in the United Kingdom, 3.4% (54) European Union, 0.0% (3) in the rest of Europe, 1.7% Africa, 1.6% Middle East and Asia and 1.7% rest of the world.

=== Ethnic group ===
In 2021, 96.2% of the population were white, 1.3% Asian, 0.2% Black, 0.2% mixed or multiple and 0.7% other ethnic group.

== Birling Gap ==
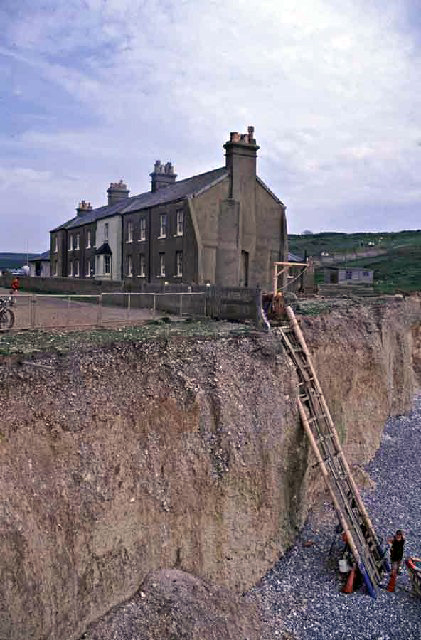
Birling Gap (2001)

Birling Gap is a coastal hamlet within the parish. It is situated on the Seven Sisters not far from Beachy Head and is owned by the National Trust.

There is a cafe, shop and visitor centre run by the National Trust, and a metal staircase leading down to the enclosed pebble beach and the Seven Sisters chalk cliffs. In time, the houses are likely to be demolished due to the severe coastal erosion; the Government has concluded that the commercial value of the houses does not justify the construction of sea defences. Coastal erosion has removed some of the row of coastguard cottages built in 1878, but those that remain are still inhabited.

The beach, which was awarded the Blue Flag rural beach award in 2005, is advertised by Naturist UK. It has a large number of rockpools.

The artist Jean Cooke lived in two cottages at Birling Gap. She painted seascapes there and died in 2008 while looking at the sea.

In August 2017, hundreds of people suffered ill effects after a suspected chemical poisoning incident.

== Geography of the Land ==
The main rock type at Birling Gap is chalk. Other rock types outcropping here include flint, loess and soil. The coastline is part of the Site of Special Scientific Interest Seaford to Beachy Head, which falls within the parish. The site is of biological and geological interest.

There is also extensive evidence and visible earthworks here of an Iron Age hillfort on the site – although nearly half of it has already been lost to the sea. Information boards at the site show how it would have originally looked; however, even more will be lost due to the geological nature of the chalk cliffs.

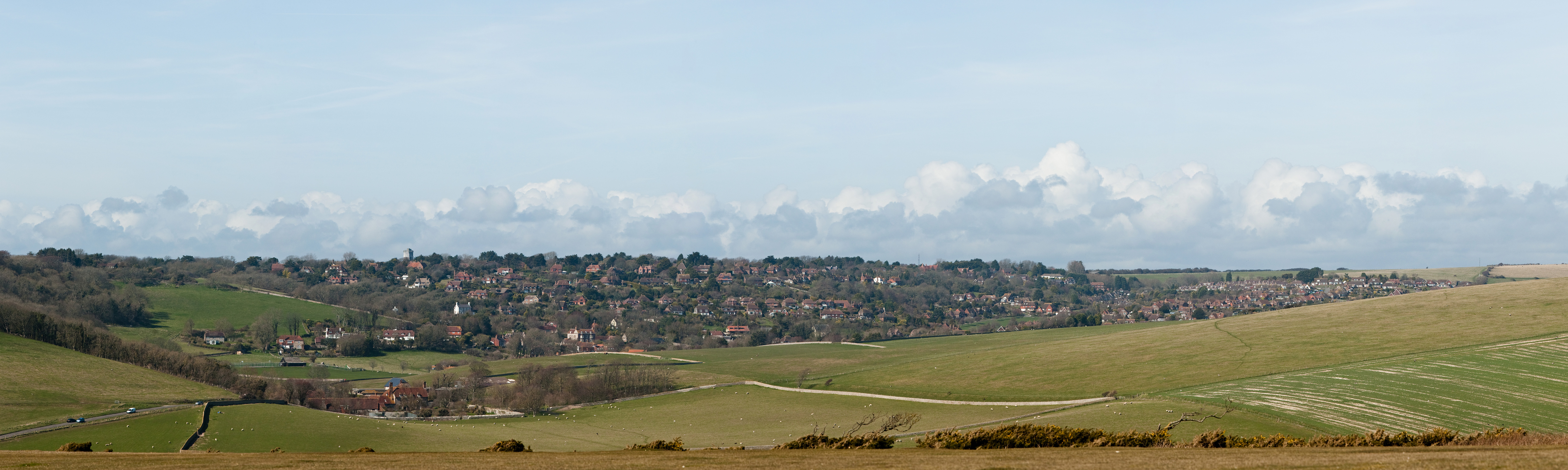
A panoramic view of East Dean and Friston, viewed from the South Downs Way near Birling Gap

== See also ==
- List of civil parishes in England
