= Beachy Head =

Chalk headland in East Sussex, England

- Cliff
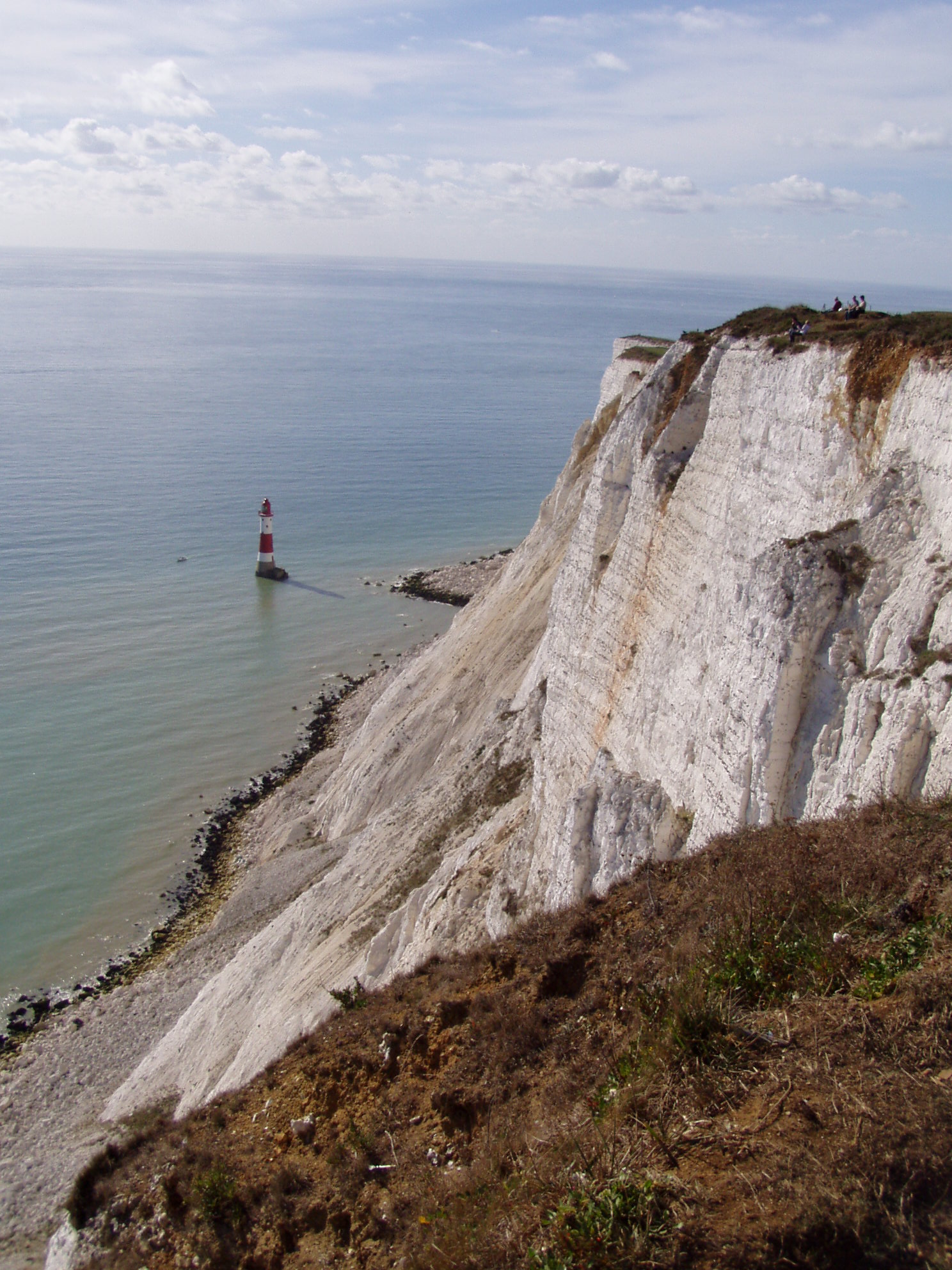
- Beachy Head Lighthouse under the cliff

- Location within East Sussex
- Coordinates: 50°44′15″N 00°14′51″E
- Location: Eastbourne, East Sussex, England
- Age: Late Cretaceous, Cenozoic
- Highest elevation: 162 m (531 ft)

Beachy Head is a chalk headland in East Sussex, England. It is situated close to Eastbourne, immediately east of the Seven Sisters.

Beachy Head is located within the administrative area of Eastbourne Borough Council which owns the land, forming part of the Eastbourne Downland Estate. The cliff is the highest chalk sea cliff in Britain, rising to 162 m (531 ft) above sea level. The peak allows views of the south east coast towards Dungeness in the east, and to the Isle of Wight in the west.

LB&SCR H2 class 4-4-2 steam locomotive number 424 (later B424, 2424, and 32424) was named Beachy Head after this landmark.

== Geology ==
The chalk was formed in the Late Cretaceous epoch, between 66 and 100 million years ago, when the area was under the sea. During the Cenozoic Era, the chalk was uplifted (see Cenozoic Era). When the last ice age ended, sea levels rose and the English Channel formed, cutting into the chalk to form the dramatic cliffs along the Sussex coast.

Wave action contributes to the erosion of cliffs around Beachy Head, which experience frequent small rock falls. Since chalk forms in layers separated by contiguous bands of flints, the physical structure affects how the cliffs erode. Wave action undermines the lower cliffs, causing frequent slab failures – slabs from layers of chalk break off, undermining the upper parts of the cliffs, which eventually collapse. In contrast to small rock falls, mass movements are less common. A mass movement happened in 2001 when, after a winter of heavy rain, the water had begun to seep into the cracks which had frozen and caused the cracks to widen. This then made the cliff edge erode and collapse into the sea, destroying a well-known chalk stack called the Devil's Chimney.

== History ==
The name Beachy Head appears as 'Beauchef' in 1274, becoming 'Beaucheif' by 1317, and it has nothing to do with the word "beach". Instead, it is a corruption of the original French words meaning "beautiful headland" (beau chef). It was regularly called Beachy Head by 1724.

In 1929, Eastbourne Borough Council bought 4,000 acres (1,600 hectares) of land surrounding Beachy Head to save it from development at a cost of about £100,000 (equivalent to £7.4 million in 2024). This land became known as the Eastbourne Downland Estate.

The prominence of Beachy Head has made it a landmark for sailors in the English Channel. It is noted as such in the sea shanty Spanish Ladies:

The first land we sighted was called the Dodman,
Next Rame Head off Plymouth, off Portsmouth the Wight;
We sailed by Beachy, by Fairlight and Dover,
And then we bore up for the South Foreland light.

The ashes of German social scientist and philosopher Friedrich Engels, one of the fathers of communism, were scattered off the cliffs at Beachy Head into the Channel, as he had requested.

Human remains discovered in the 1950s were subjected to forensic reconstruction, carbon dating, and radioisotype analysis, and it was concluded that they were those of a Roman woman of Sub-Saharan African origin who grew up in the Eastbourne area in about 200–250 CE. She became known as Beachy Head Lady. and at time of discovery was the centre of public shock due to her cropped clothing. However, in 2021, DNA testing indicated she was of "southern European lineage, most likely from Cyprus"; the parish later ordered the removal of a plaque erected by the BBC "to commemorate the first black Briton." However on 17th December 2025, it was confirmed from further studies the woman was probably of white British heritage.

In 2026, a bizarre incident took place when the beach was covered with chips (French fries) and onions. The incident was most likely caused by two containers falling overboard from different cargo ships while encountering stormy weather. A cleanup operation began in January 2026. According to reports, thousands of bags of chips were washed ashore, and volunteers were asked to join the cleanup effort through social media.

== Lighthouse ==
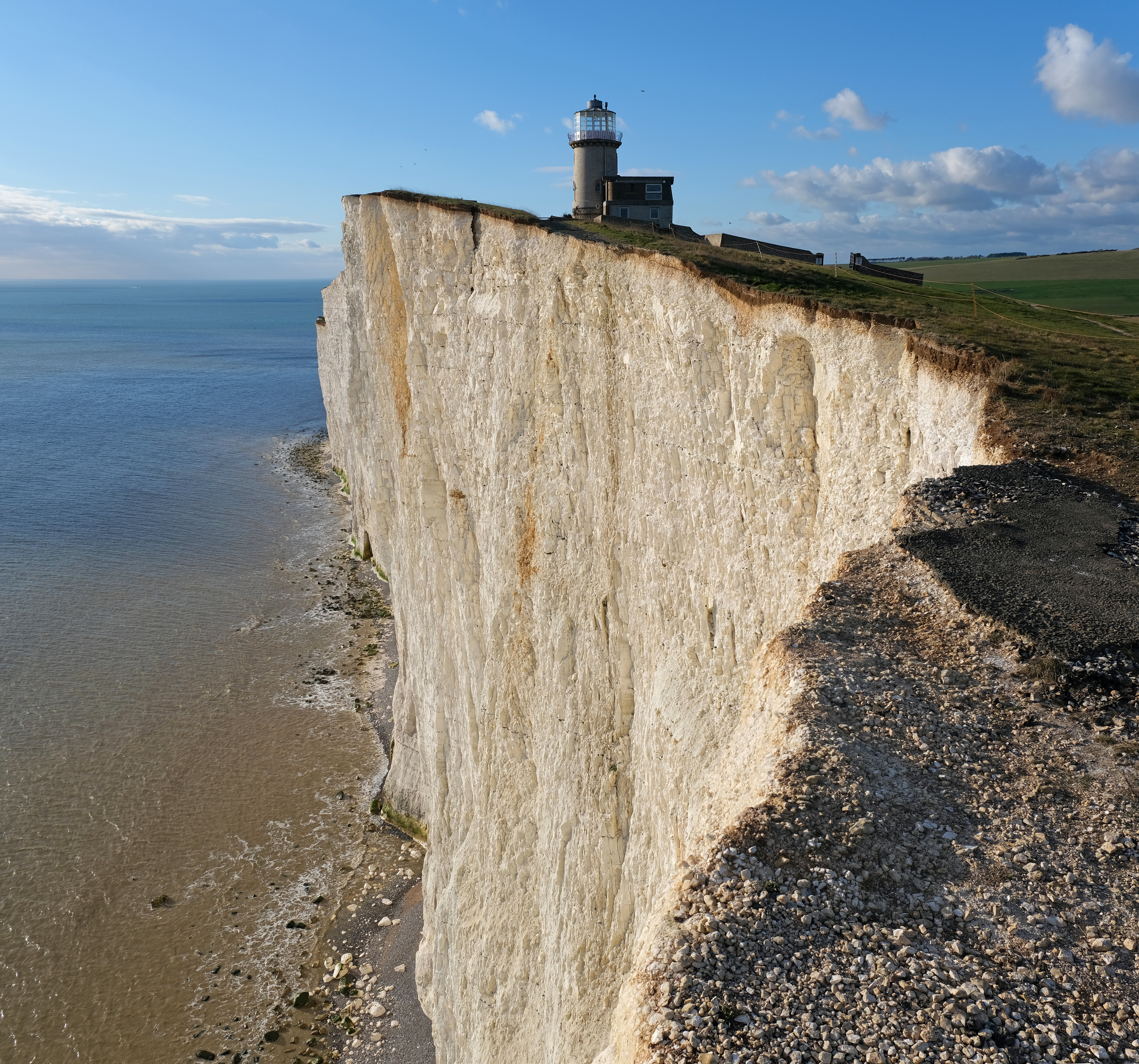
Belle Tout Lighthouse

The headland has been considered a danger to shipping. In 1831, construction began on the Belle Tout Lighthouse on the next headland west from Beachy Head. Because mist and low clouds could hide the light of Belle Tout, it was decommissioned in 1902, after the Beachy Head Lighthouse had been built in the sea below Beachy Head as a replacement.

== At war ==
The third day of fighting in the Battle of Portland in 1653 took place off Beachy Head during the First Anglo-Dutch War. The Battle of Beachy Head in 1690 was a naval engagement during the Nine Years' War. The so-called Second Battle of Beachy Head took place over a week in September 1916 during the First World War. Three German U-boats sank 30 merchant ships between Beachy Head and the Eddystone. This was despite a major effort involving the Royal Navy and 49 destroyers, 48 torpedo boats, seven 'Q' ships and 468 auxiliaries.

During the Second World War, the Royal Air Force (RAF) established a forward relay station at Beachy Head to improve radio communications with aircraft. In 1942, signals were picked up at Beachy Head which were identified as TV transmissions from the Eiffel Tower. The Germans had reactivated the pre-war TV transmitter and instituted a Franco-German service for military hospitals and VIPs in the Paris region. The RAF monitored these programmes, hoping (in vain) to gather intelligence from newsreels. The area had an important wartime radar station. During the Cold War, a radar control centre was operational in an underground bunker from 1953 to 1957. On 20 May 1942, a Messerschmitt Bf 109 of JG26 piloted by Uffz. Oswald Fischer belly-landed on the beach due to flak damage. Fischer was taken prisoner, and the relatively undamaged plane was sent to RAE Farnborough for examination and evaluation. The plane was probably scrapped at the end of the war.

== Tourism ==
West from Belle Tout, the cliffs drop down to Birling Gap, then ascend through the Seven Sisters chalk cliffs to Haven Brow, overlooking the Cuckmere valley. The area is a popular tourist attraction. Birling Gap has a restaurant and, in the summer, multiple ice cream vans serve the area. There are many choices of walking routes.

== Suicides ==
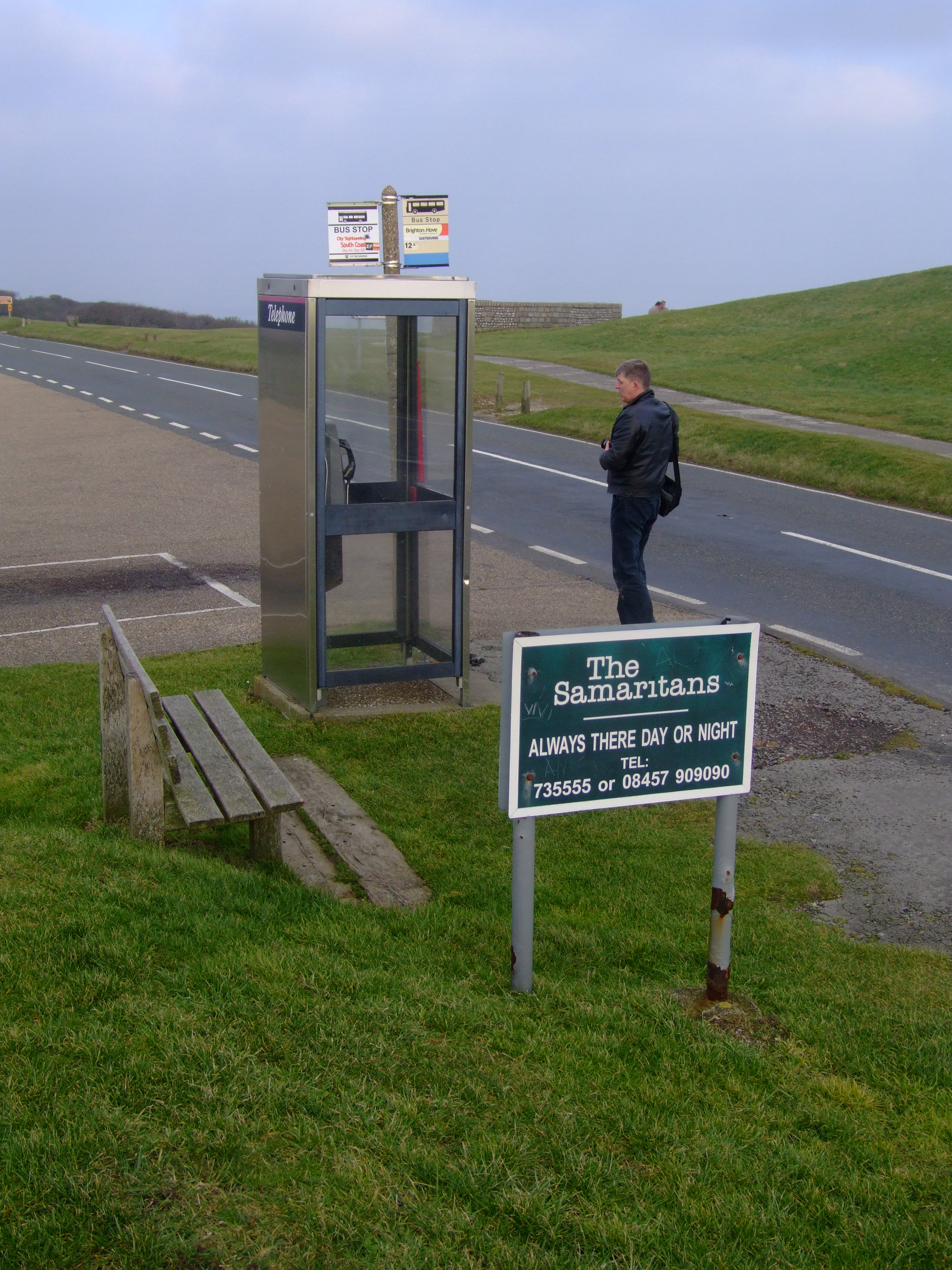
Phone box and sign advertising the Samaritans at Beachy Head.

Estimates of the number of annual deaths at Beachy Head were about 20 a year in the time period around 2009. At least 26 people died at the site in 2008. In 2010, it was the third most common suicide spot in the world, after the Golden Gate Bridge in San Francisco and the Aokigahara Woods in Japan, according to The Wall Street Journal.

The Beachy Head Chaplaincy Team conducts regular day and evening patrols of the area in attempts to locate and stop potential cliff jumpers. Workers at the pub and taxi drivers are also on the lookout for people contemplating suicide and there are signs with the telephone number of the Samaritans urging potential jumpers to call them.

Deaths at the site are often covered by the media, and Ross Hardy, the founder of the chaplaincy team, has said that this encourages suicidal people to choose the site. Eastbourne Borough Council drew media coverage in 2018 for its policy of removing shrines and crosses left at Beachy Head by families of suicide victims.

The earliest reports of deaths by suicide at Beachy Head come from the 7th century. Between 1965 and 1979, there were 124 deaths at the location. Of these, S. J. Surtees wrote that 115 of them were "almost certainly" suicides (although a coroner's verdict of suicide was recorded in only 58 cases), and that 61 percent of the victims were from outside East Sussex. After a steady increase in deaths between 2002 and 2005, there were only seven fatalities in 2006, a marked decrease. HM Coastguard – whose rescue teams are responsible for assisting people attempting self-harm at the site, the rescue of injured jumpers, and assisting in the recovery of the deceased – attributed the reduction to the work of the Chaplaincy Team and good coverage of services by the local media.

== Use in entertainment and media ==
=== In film ===
The location Beachy Head has appeared in numerous films:

- It is featured in the climax of the 1931 film The Flying Fool, in which the villain's car is chased by the hero's plane over the cliffs. The car driven by the villain for the long chase sequence is a 4 1/2 litre Bentley belonging to Sir Henry (Tim) Birkin, whose private motor works was across the street from the studio in Welwyn Garden City that made the film. Captain Birkin's Motor Works, set up to develop the "blower" Bentley, built a dummy car from spare parts to be filmed falling from the cliffs.
- In the final scene of the 1947 film The Upturned Glass, the murderer, an eminent surgeon played by James Mason, commits suicide by stepping off the cliff.
- The area and lighthouse appear as a backdrop in the 1964 film The Chalk Garden, featuring Hayley Mills.
- It appears briefly in the 1968 film Chitty Chitty Bang Bang, when Chitty falls from it and then flies for the first time.
- The area is visible in aerial scenes of the 1969 film Battle of Britain when RAF Spitfires of Squadron Leader Canfield (Michael Caine) intercept German Stuka bombers.
- In the 1979 film Quadrophenia, the final scene shows Phil Daniels jumping off a scooter just before it goes over the top of Beachy Head.
- The 1980 film Hopscotch with Walter Matthau and Glenda Jackson has a flying scene that includes a mid-air explosion over the cliffs with the lighthouse in view below.
- The cliff appears in the opening sequence of the 1987 James Bond film The Living Daylights, in which Bond (portrayed for the first time by Timothy Dalton) parachutes from a Land Rover which drives off the top of the cliff in a scene scripted as being in Gibraltar.
- In the 1989 film Henry V, the Prologue from Act II introducing the traitors was filmed at Beachy Head.
- In the 2005 film Harry Potter and the Goblet of Fire, Beachy Head was used as hosting grounds for the 1994 Quidditch World Cup.
- The area was used as a backdrop in many key scenes in Jenny Downham's 2007 young adult novel Before I Die and in its 2012 film adaptation directed by Ol Parker Now Is Good.
- The 2010 remake of Graham Greene's Brighton Rock was filmed extensively at Beachy Head as well as in nearby Eastbourne, which was preferred to Brighton.
- It appears in the 2017 film The Hitman's Bodyguard in the scene driving to Amsterdam. It shows both Beachy Head lighthouse and Bell Tout lighthouse, although Bell Tout had red and white stripes added by CGI.
- It is featured in the 2018 film Fantastic Beasts: The Crimes of Grindelwald, when Newt Scamander and his muggle friend Jacob Kowalski use an illegal portkey to teleport to France.

=== In literature and publications ===
- Romantic poet Charlotte Smith's poem Beachy Head, published in 1807, uses the geography of Beachy Head to reflect on the history of England and human nature.
- Eastbourne born poet Andrew Franks includes a number of references to Beachy Head in his work, including Belle Tout in his collection, The Last of the Great British Traitors.
- In Howard Jacobson's 2010 Man Booker Prize-winning novel, The Finkler Question, the bereaved widower Libor Sevcik commits suicide by jumping off the cliff at Beachy Head.
- In Richard Jefferies' fine essay 'The Breeze on Beachy Head', first published in the 'Standard' on 6 September 1881 and collected in 'Nature Near London' in 1883.
- In Clare Mackintosh’s 2018 novel, ‘Let Me Lie’, Beachy Head is a prime location where two key characters commit suicide.

=== In music ===
- The cover photo of English avant-garde quartet Throbbing Gristle's 1979 record 20 Jazz Funk Greats was taken at Beachy Head. There is also a track named "Beachy Head" on the album.
- In 1980, the beach was used as a location for David Bowie's music video to promote his single "Ashes to Ashes".
- The Cure used the location for the music videos of their 1985 and 1987 singles "Close to Me" and "Just Like Heaven".
- The location is referenced in the song "Running Wild" on the album Undertow by the British band Drenge.
- Progressive Celtic rock band Iona included a song titled "Beachy Head" on their 1993 album, Beyond These Shores.
- Beachy Head was used as a film location for the video of 'Quello Che Faro', an operatic cover of Bryan Adams' "Everything I Do, I Do It For You", recorded by classical-crossover artist, Katherine Jenkins on her 2006 album, Serenade.
- Alternative rock band Nada Surf mentions Beachy Head in "The Fox", a song from their 2008 album Lucky.
- British indie pop band Veronica Falls released a song titled "Beachy Head" urging people not to commit suicide in September 2010.
- Canadian band Stars included a song, "Palmistry", taking place at Beachy Head, on their 2022 album From Capelton Hill.

=== In television ===
- Belle Tout Lighthouse and the surrounding area are shown throughout the 1986 BBC TV series The Life and Loves of a She-Devil.
- Beachy Head is seen in the fourth series of Luther, a drama on BBC TV.
- Beachy Head and its lighthouse serve as a key location in the 7th episode of the British series The Prisoner.
- Beachy Head is featured in the first episode of the second series of Black Mirror, "Be Right Back".
- Beachy Head was used as the location for a Monty Python sketch.
- Jeremy Clarkson performed a 50th birthday tribute for the Jaguar E Type on Beachy Head during an episode of Top Gear
- In the 17 December 2021 release of The Grand Tour, Beachy Head was filmed during the end of the episode of "Carnage a Trois" whilst Clarkson and Hammond were driving the Citroën SM

=== In technology ===
A photo of Beachy Head was used as a desktop wallpaper on Windows 7.

== Gallery ==
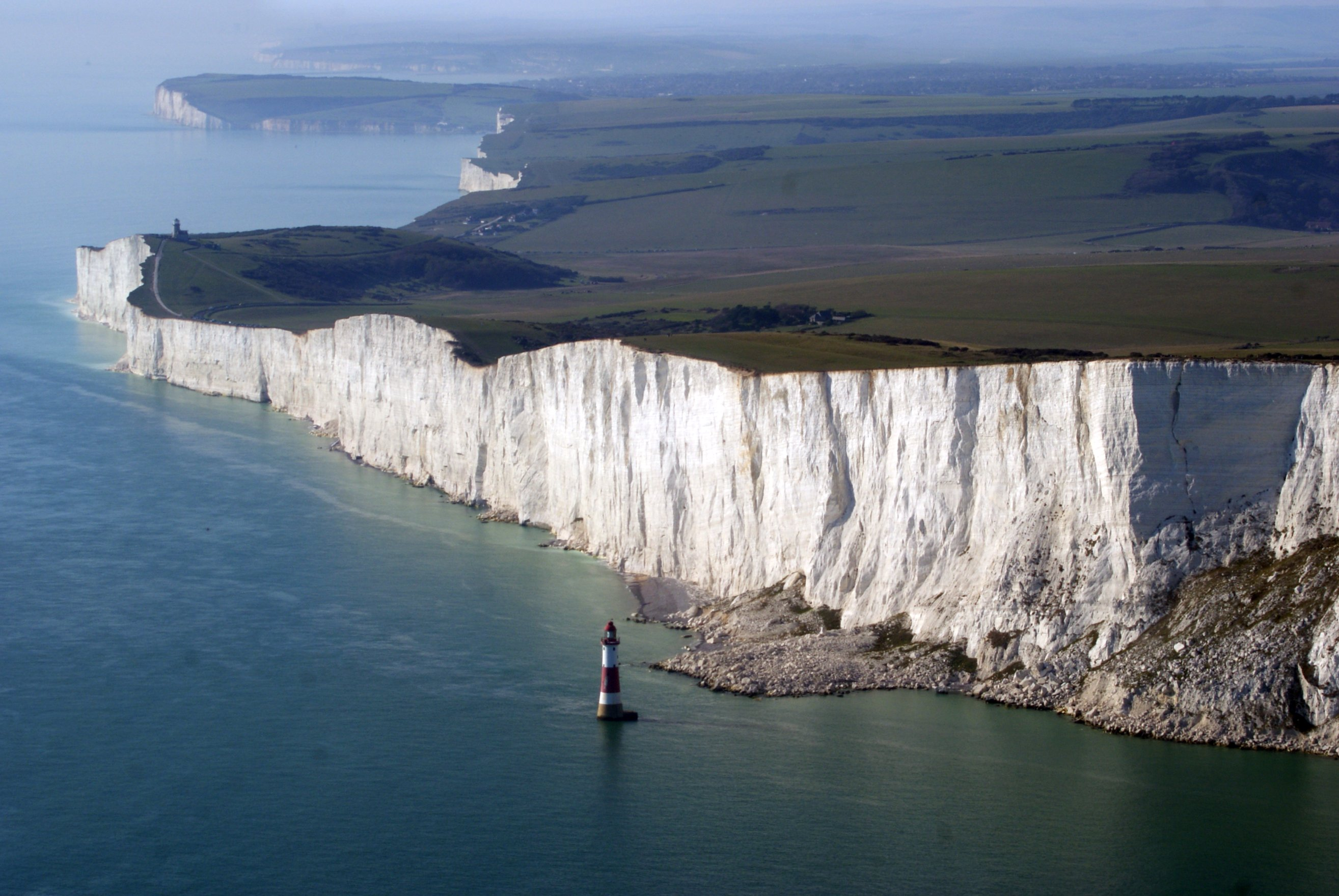
Beachy Head from the air, with Beachy Head Lighthouse at its foot.

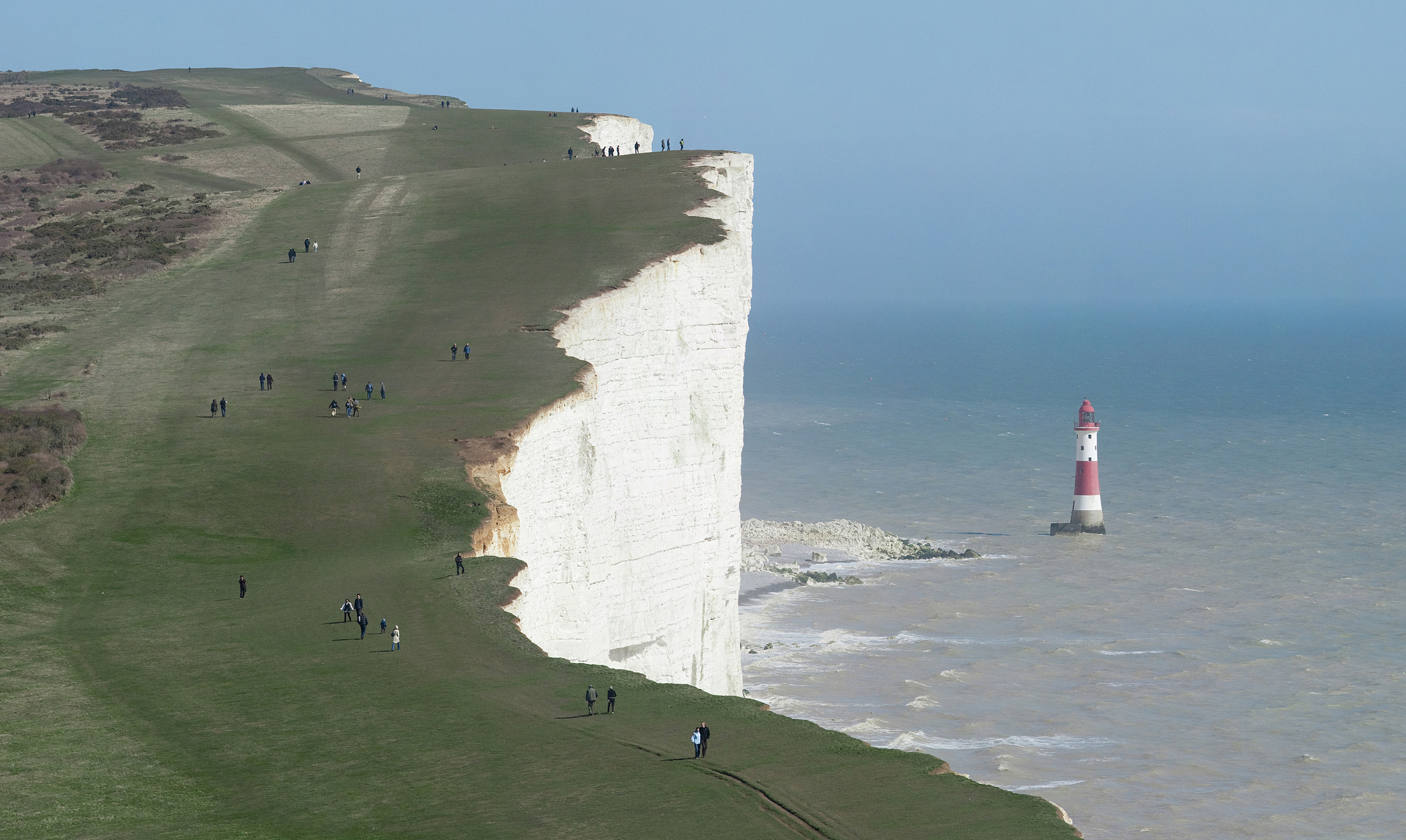
Looking towards the cliffs and lighthouse from the west near Birling Gap.

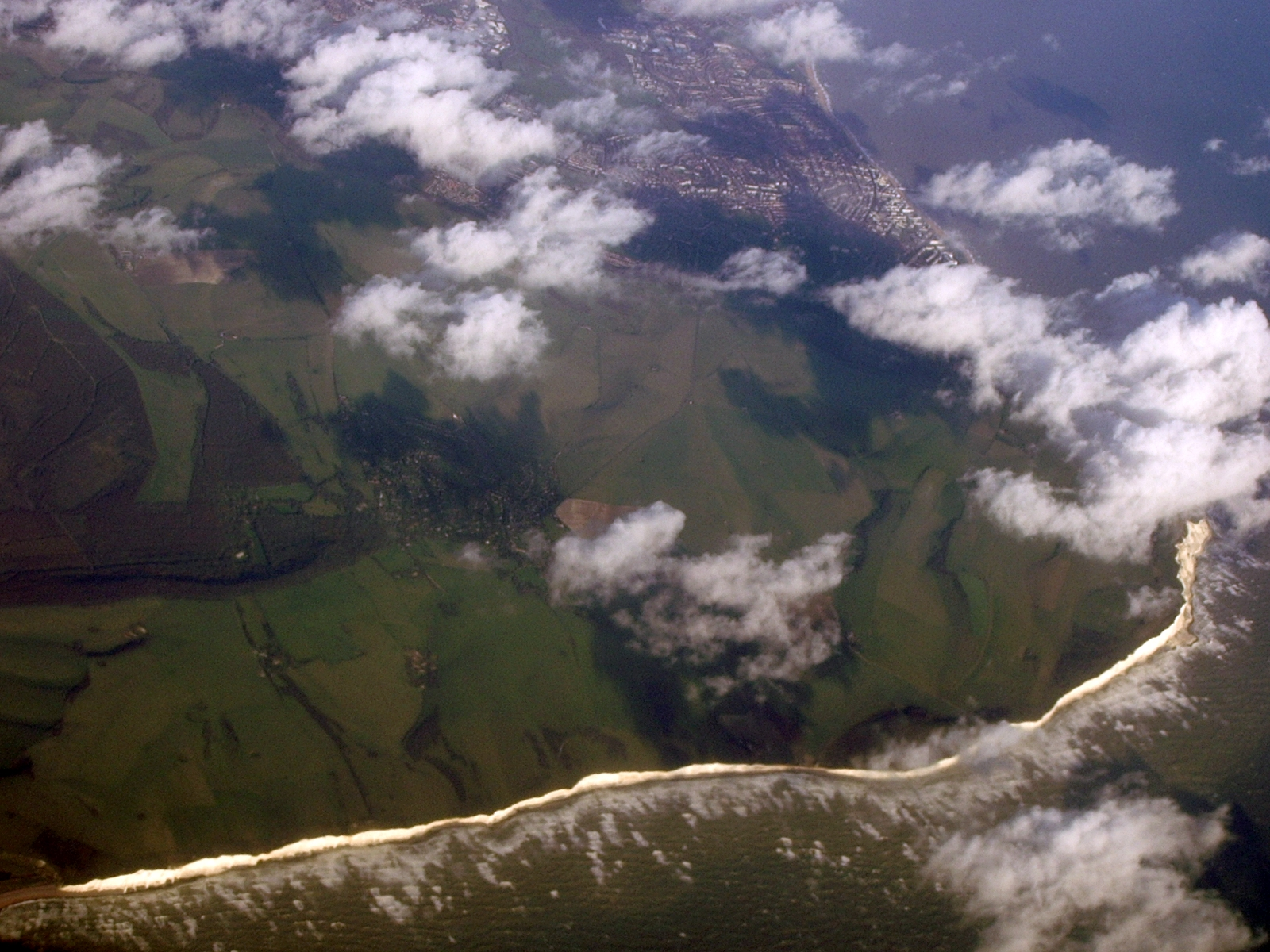
Aerial view of Beachy Head, with Eastbourne visible at the top of the photo.

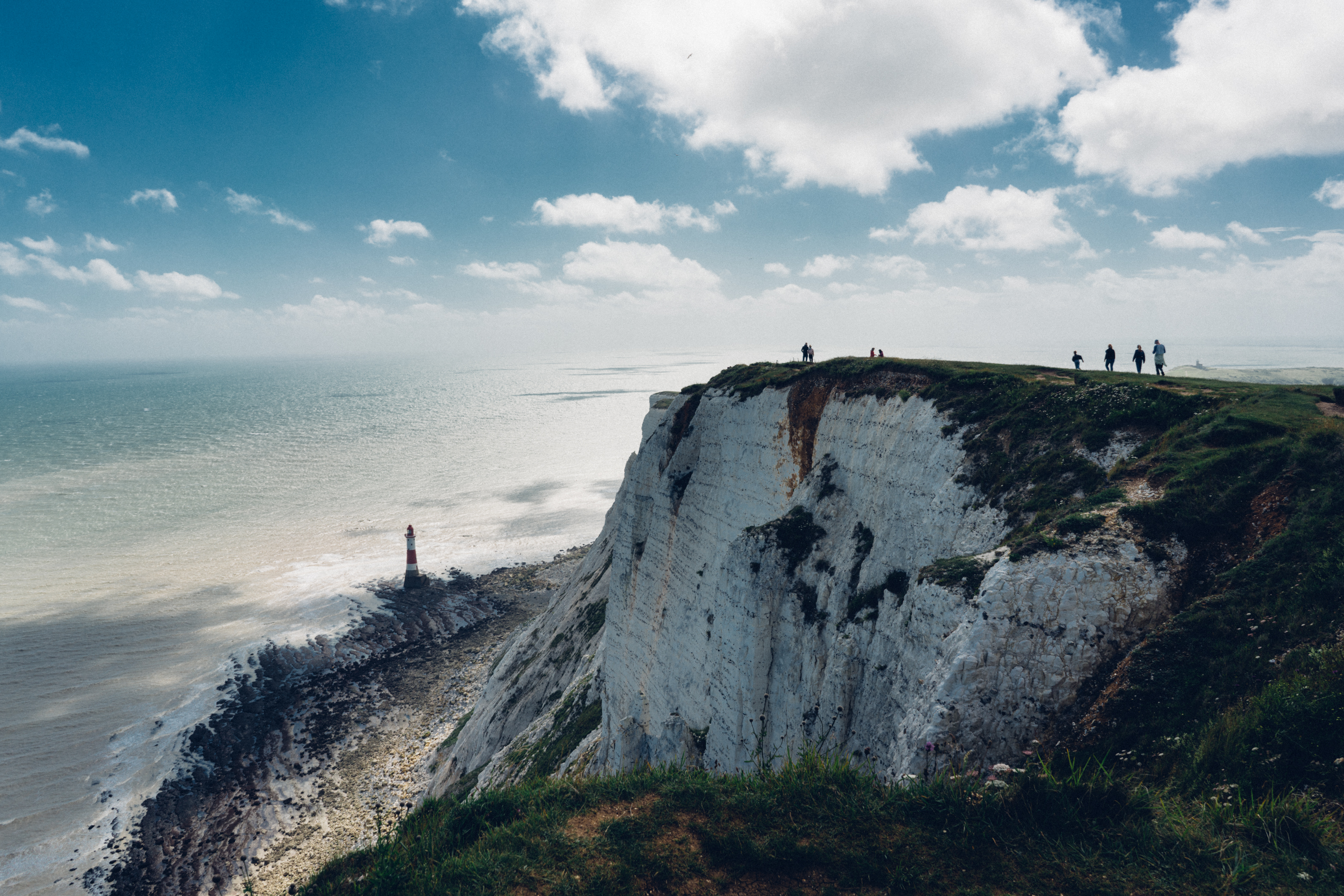
