= Belle Tout Lighthouse =

Lighthouse at Beachy Head, East Sussex, England

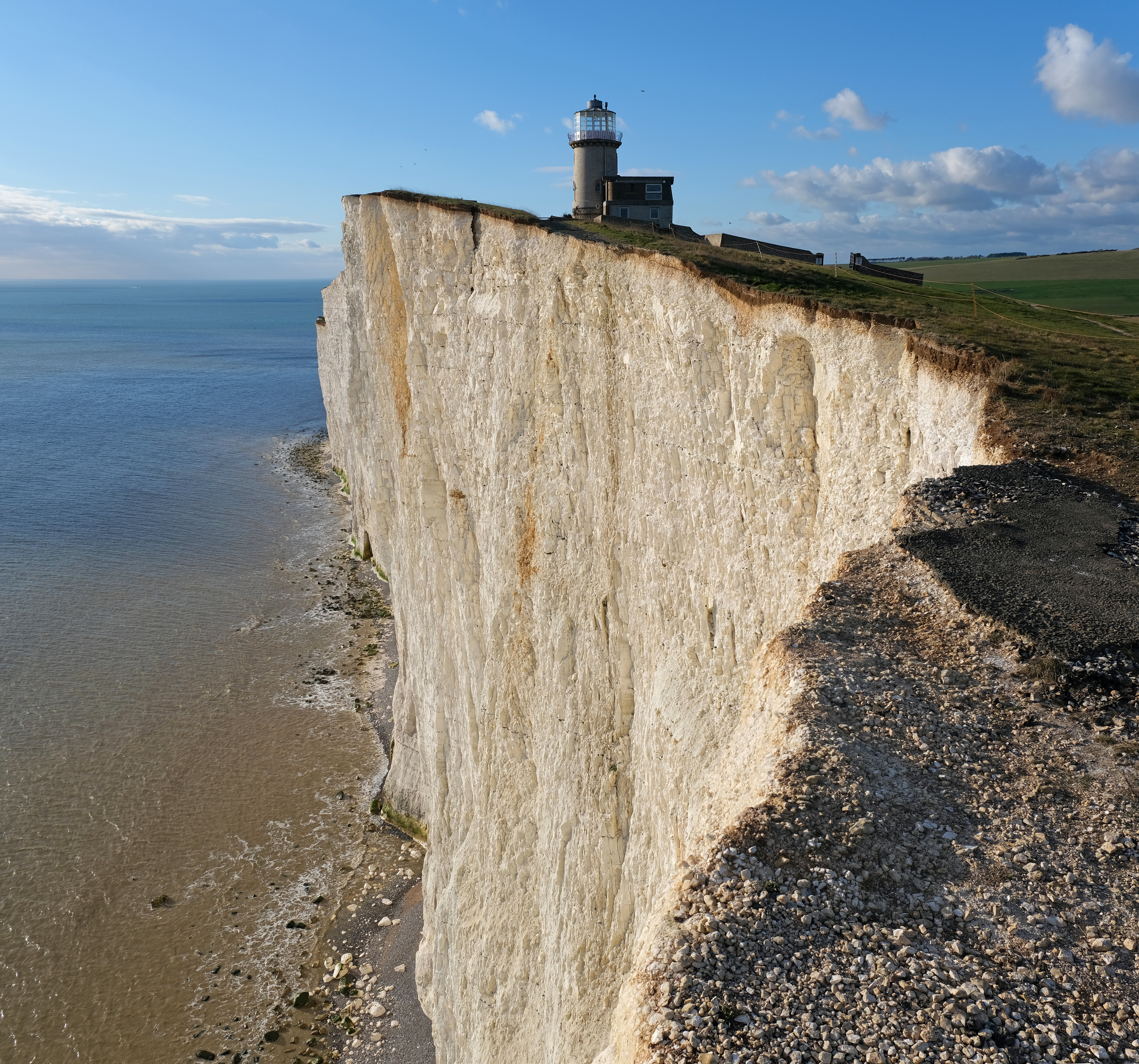
- Belle Tout Lighthouse and the cliffs
- Location: Beachy Head; East Sussex; England
- OS grid: TV5635695509
- Coordinates: 50°44′18″N 00°12′53″E

Tower
- Constructed: 1832
- Construction: stone tower
- Height: 14 m (46 ft)
- Shape: Cylindrical tower design with balcony and lantern
- Operator: Belle Tout Lighthouse
- Heritage: Grade II listed building

Light
- First lit: 1834
- Deactivated: 1902
- Focal height: 87 m (285 ft)

The Belle Tout Lighthouse (also spelled Belle Toute) is a decommissioned lighthouse at Beachy Head, East Sussex, England, near the town of Eastbourne. It is a Grade II listed building.

The Belle Tout Lighthouse has been called "Britain's most famous inhabited lighthouse" for its striking location and use in film and television. In 1999, it was moved in one piece to prevent it from succumbing to coastal erosion.

== History ==
=== Construction ===
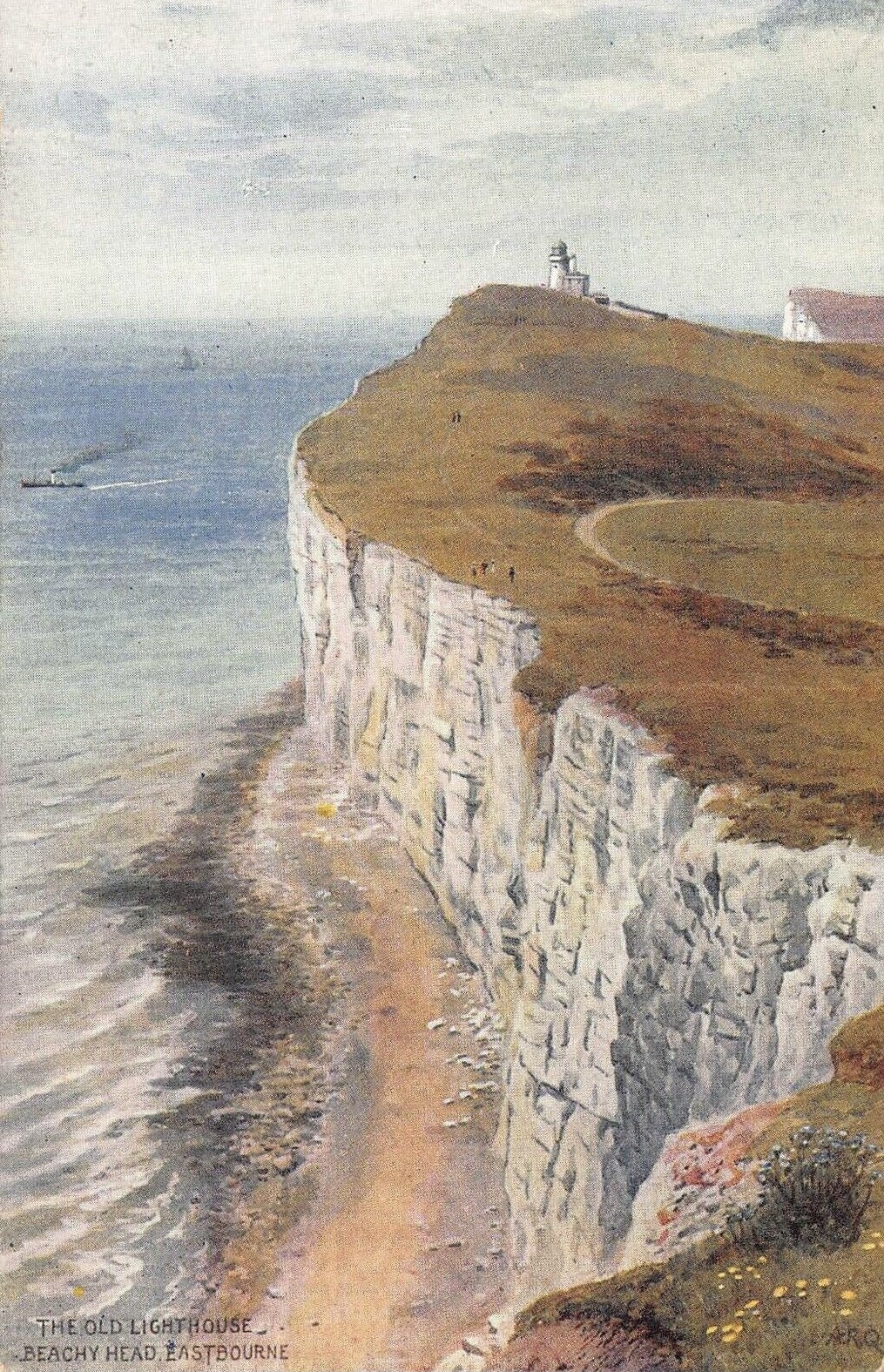
The Old Light House, Beachy Head (postcard c1920) by A. R. Quinton

The cliffs near Beachy Head saw numerous shipwrecks in the 17th and early 18th centuries and a petition to erect a lighthouse started around 1691. The calls were ignored for over 100 years until The Thames, an East Indiaman, crashed into the rocks off Beachy Head.

The petition gained momentum with the support of a Captain of the Royal Navy and Trinity House, the official lighthouse authority, agreed to attend to the matter. Having witnessed the incident himself, John 'Mad Jack' Fuller, MP for Sussex, used his influence and some of his personal wealth to fund the lighthouse construction. The first Belle Tout lighthouse was a temporary wooden structure that started service on 1 October 1828. It displayed a revolving light, which exhibited 'its greatest brilliancy once in two minutes'.

The construction of the permanent granite lighthouse began in 1829 to a design by Thomas Stevenson and it became operational on 11 October 1834. The light was provided by a three-sided rotating array of oil lamps, with ten lamps on each side, each lamp mounted within a parabolic reflector. Its use of 30 oil lamps meant that the lighthouse would require two gallons of oil every hour.

In 1887 the light was altered. It was equipped with the latest Douglass two-wick oil burners: six lamps and reflectors on each side of a clockwork-driven revolving triangular frame (eighteen lamps in total). The speed of rotation was significantly increased so as to give a four-second flash every fifteen seconds.

=== Decommission and sale ===
The lighthouse was not as successful as had been hoped, with two significant flaws leading to an alternative being sought. The cliff-top location caused problems when sea mists obscured the light, significantly reducing the distance that it would reach. Vessels that sailed too close to the rocks would not be able to see the light because it was blocked by the edge of the cliff.

However, the cliffs of Beachy Head suffered intense coastal erosion over the years and the rocky area started to be covered by the light.

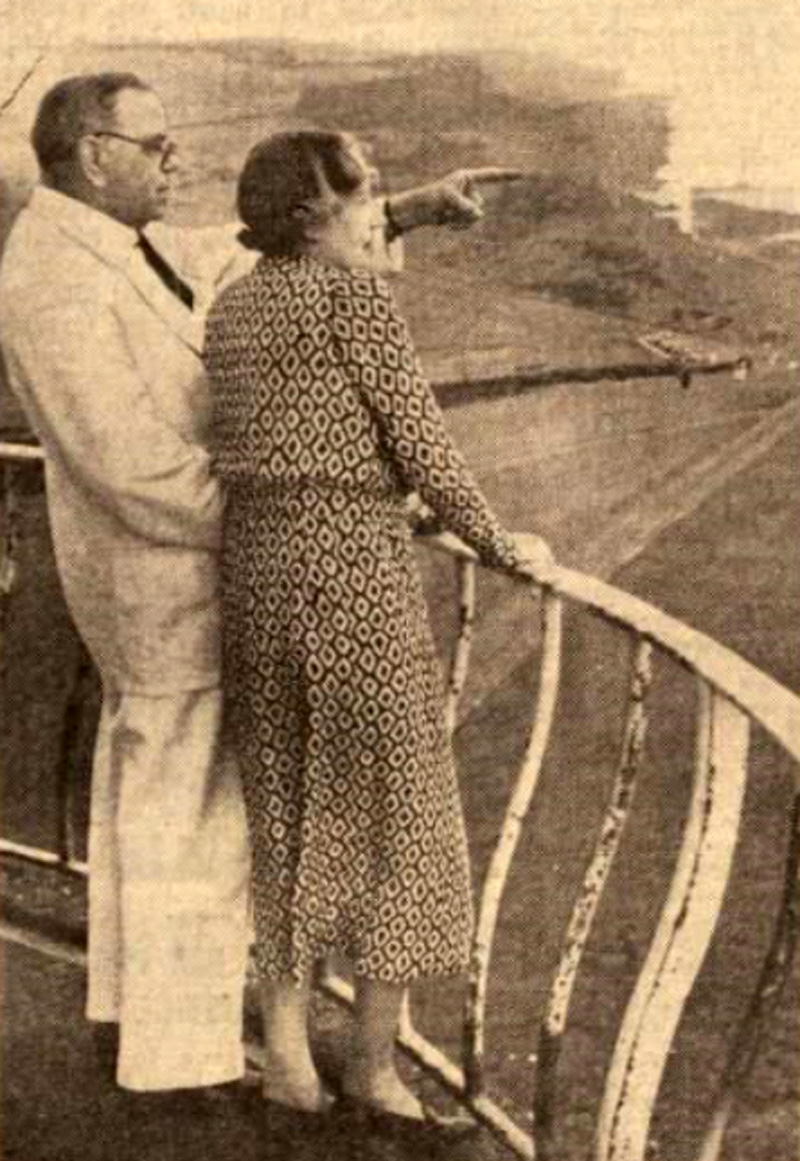
Sir James and Lady Purves-Stewart at Belle Tout in 1938

The Belle Tout was in service until 2 October 1902, when a new lighthouse was built at the bottom of the cliffs, known simply as the Beachy Head Lighthouse. Trinity House sold off the building in 1903, after which time it changed hands several times.

One purchaser was Sir James Purves-Stewart, who constructed an access road and upgraded the building.

During the Second World War the building was left empty. It was badly damaged by Canadian artillery fire, although the lighthouse itself was not the target: the guns were firing at wooden silhouettes of tanks which ran up the hill along rails to the east of building. The trace of the railway track is still discernible.

After the local council took ownership in 1948, the decision was made to restore the lighthouse because of its historical significance. The ground floor of Stevenson's adjoining cottage was restored and its ruined first floor replaced with a new piano nobile, designed and built by Ted Cullinan. Building work was carried out under lease in 1956 and the lighthouse was brought up to date with modern amenities.

In 1986, the BBC purchased the lease to Belle Tout for the filming of mini-series The Life and Loves of a She-Devil and a year later it featured in the James Bond film The Living Daylights. From 1996 the lighthouse was used as a family home and, in 2007, the building was put up for sale again. It now includes six bedrooms and large walled gardens.

The lighthouse was further immortalised in the song "Belle Tout" by British rock band Subterraneans, and in the movie B Monkey starring Asia Argento. The glass "round room" which once housed the light itself was featured on the popular BBC television show Changing Rooms, wherein it was redesigned by celebrity interior designer Laurence Llewelyn-Bowen.

=== Coastal erosion ===
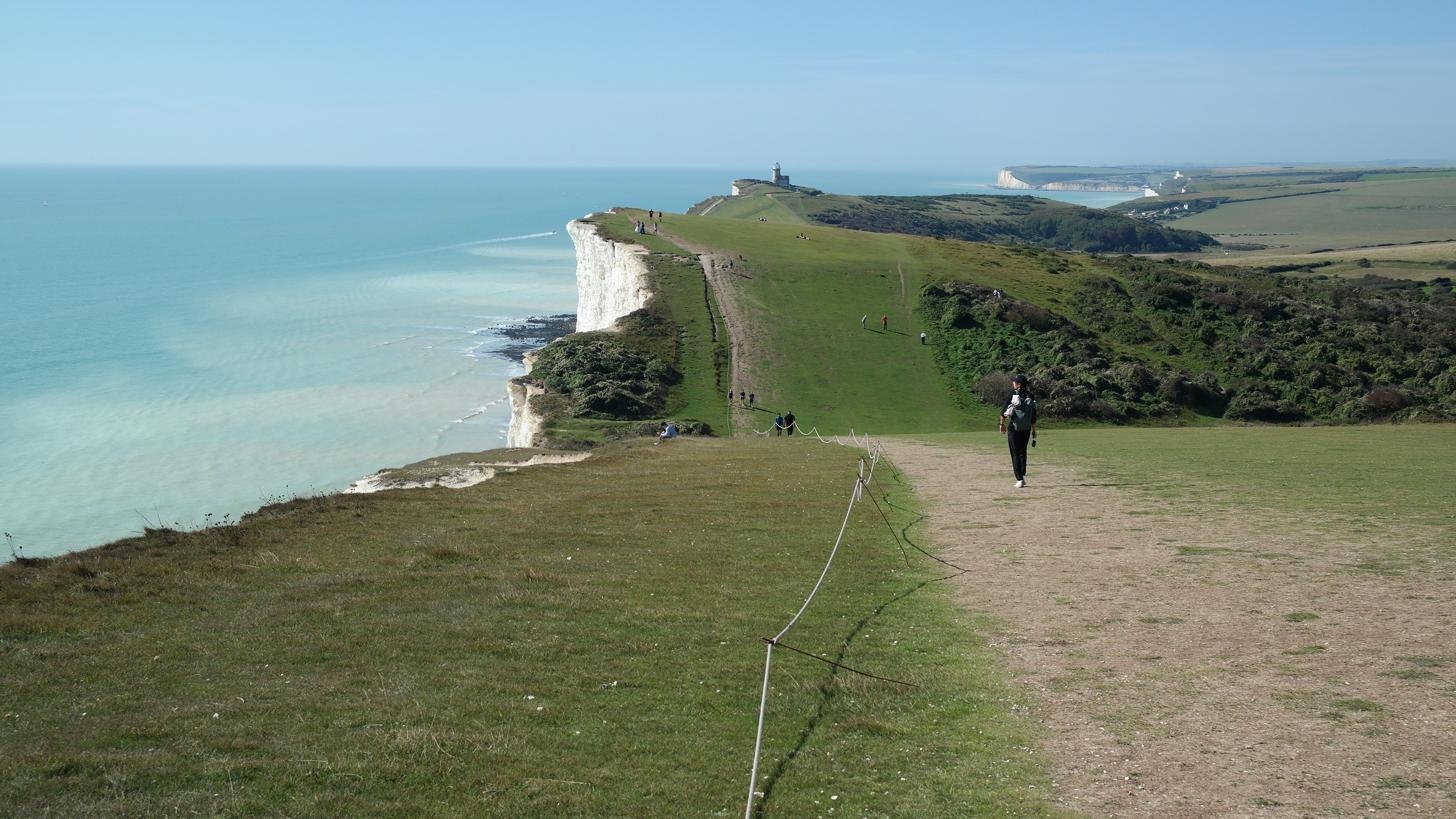
The Seven Sisters and Beachy Head route overlooks the English Channel

By 1999 the erosion of the cliffs was threatening the foundations of the building and drastic steps had to be taken to stop it from falling into the sea. On 17 March 1999 the Belle Tout was moved 17 metres (56 ft) away from the cliff face.

The 850-ton lighthouse was moved using a pioneering system of hydraulic jacks which pushed the building along four steel-topped concrete beams that were constantly lubricated with grease, work undertaken by the engineering firm Abbey Pynford.

The site should now be safe for many years and has been designed to enable further moves as and when they are required.

== Belle Toute Lighthouse Preservation Trust ==
The "Belle Toute Lighthouse Preservation Trust" was formed in 2007 to bring together a non-profit organisation that could raise the funds to purchase the lighthouse so that it can be opened as a tourist attraction and bed and breakfast. The trust was wound up in May 2008.

== Restoration and conversion to a bed and breakfast ==
In January 2010, the lighthouse appeared on Channel 5 in a programme named Build a New Life in the Country. This showed how it was purchased in 2008 and converted into a bed and breakfast. Belle Tout lighthouse had been bought for £500,000 and a further £700,000 was spent restoring it. The original access road was too close to the edge of the cliff; the payment of an easement fee to build a new road had to be negotiated with the local council. The bed and breakfast and its panoramic guest room were also visited by comedian Susan Calman on her Channel 5 show Susan Calman’s Grand Day Out.

== Gallery ==
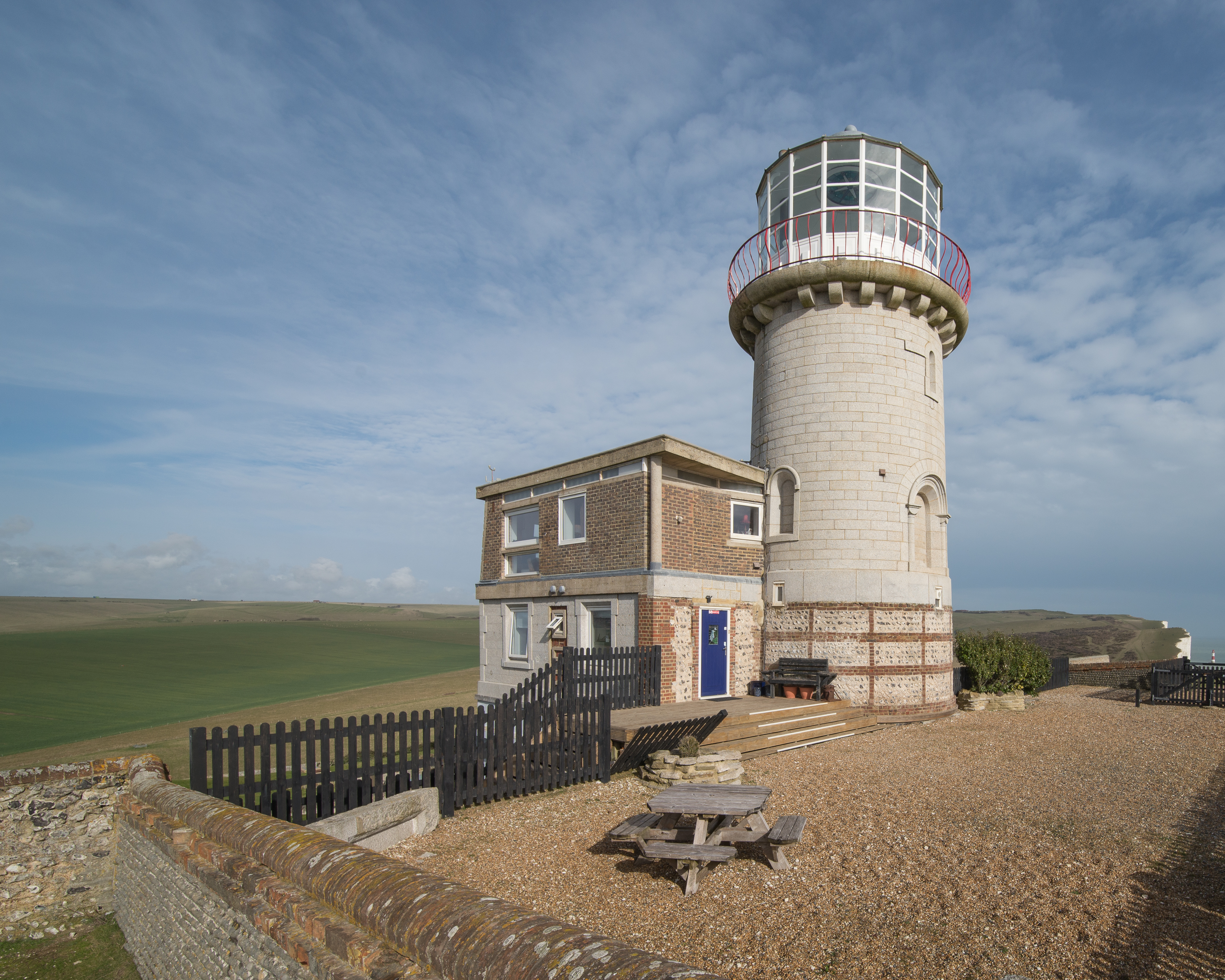
Belle Tout Lighthouse in 2017.

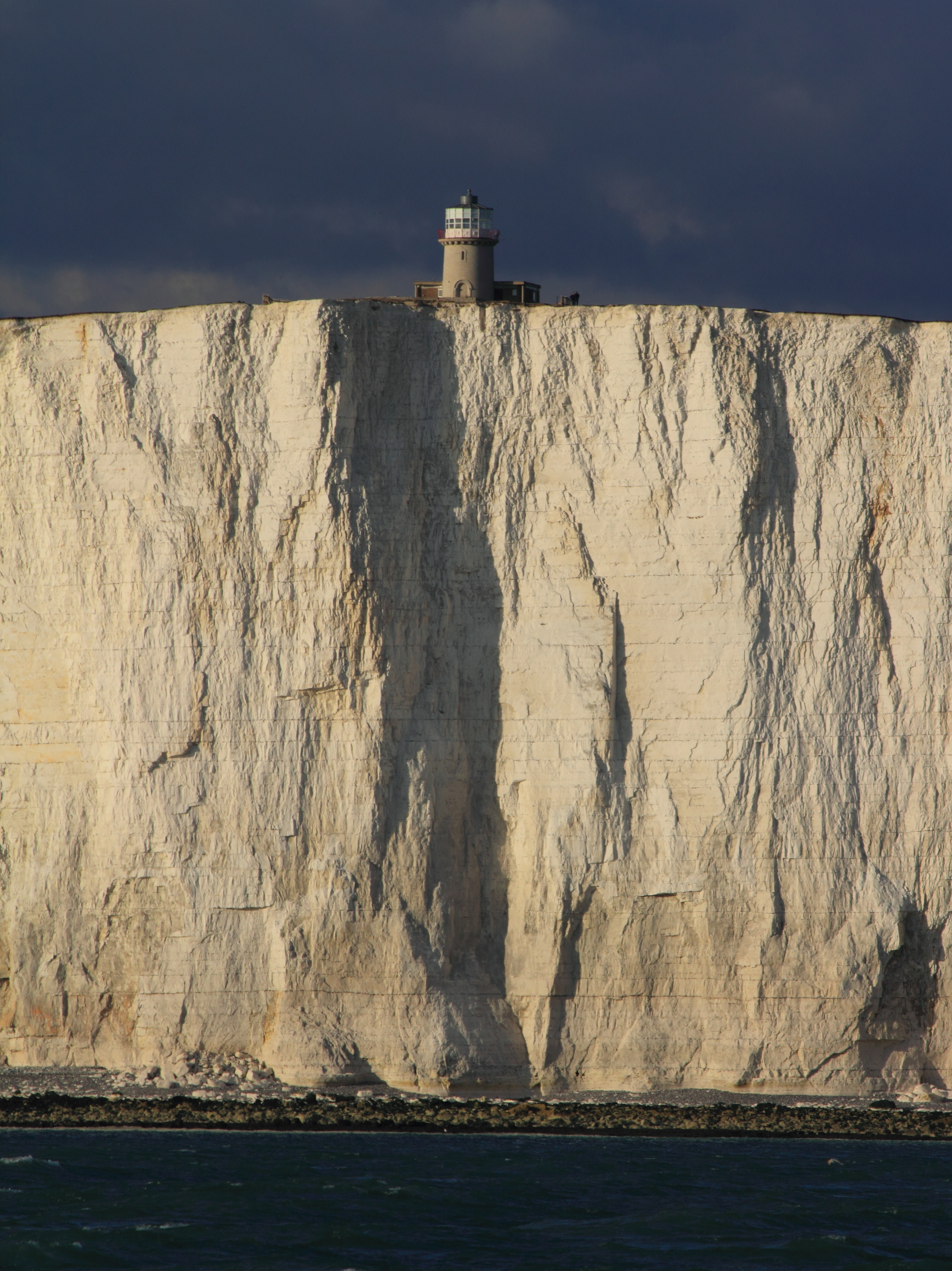
View from the English Channel in 2010.

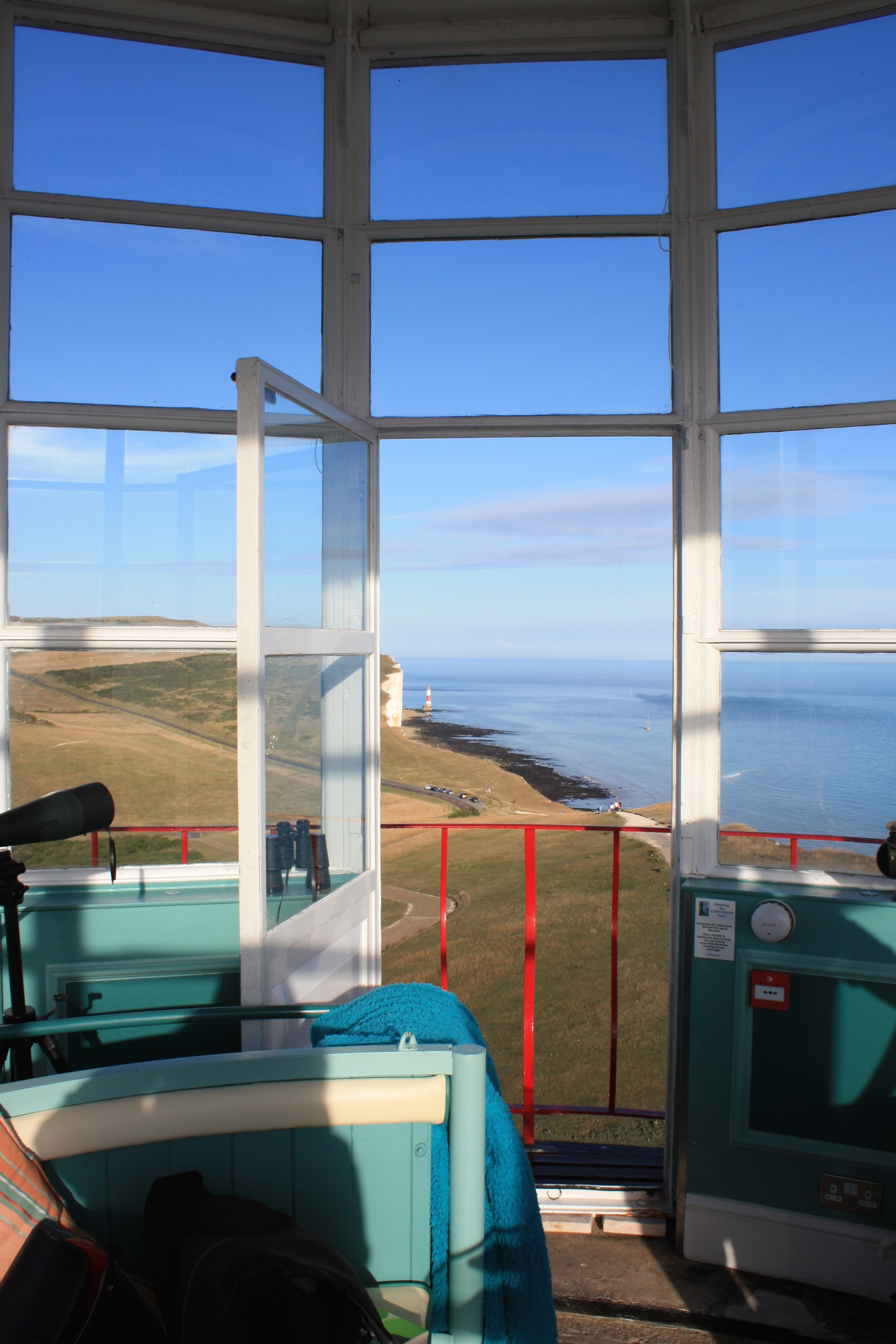
Looking east from the Round Room, with the new Beachy Head Lighthouse visible.

== See also ==
- Beachy Head
- Eastbourne
- Listed buildings in Eastbourne
- List of lighthouses in England
