= Listed buildings in Eastbourne =

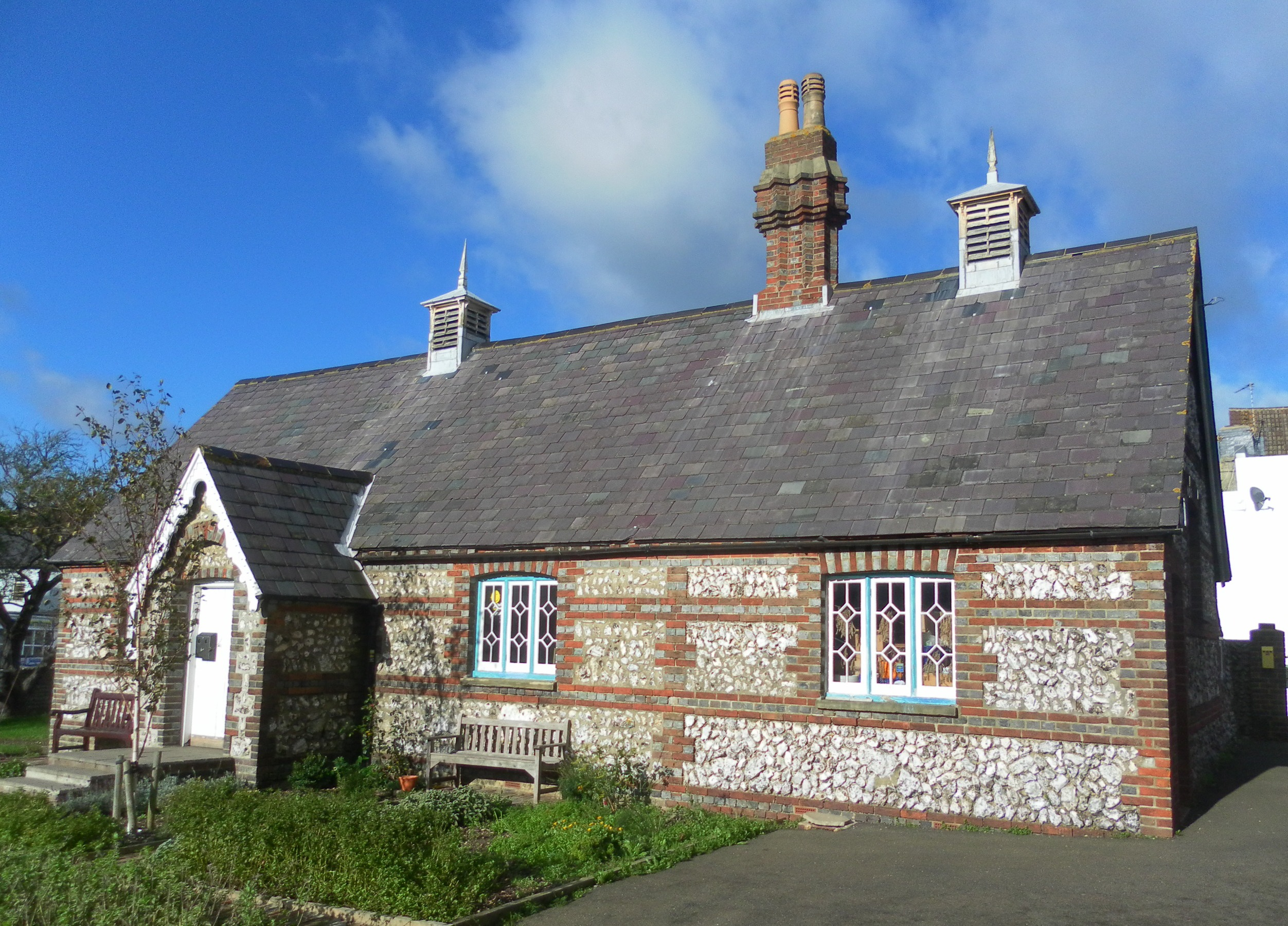
Listed buildings include Brodie Hall, formerly a school, built in the grounds of Christ Church.

There are more than 130 listed buildings in the town and borough of Eastbourne, a seaside resort on the coast of East Sussex, England. Eastbourne, whose estimated population in 2011 was 99,400, grew from a collection of farming hamlets into a fashionable holiday destination in the mid-19th century. Close attention was paid to urban planning and architecture, and the principal landowners, the Dukes of Devonshire, placed restrictions on the types and locations of development. As a result, much of the resort retains its "basic motif" of late Regency and early Victorian houses, hotels, and similar buildings, and also has an extensive stock of 19th-century churches. Coastal fortifications have been strategically important for centuries, and structures such as Martello towers and fortresses have survived to receive listed status. A few older buildings—including priories, manor houses, and the ancient parish church—are also spread throughout the borough, whose boundaries include the dramatic cliffs at Beachy Head and its two listed lighthouses.

In England, a building or structure is defined as "listed" when it is placed on a statutory register of buildings of "special architectural or historic interest" by the Secretary of State for Culture, Media and Sport, a government department, in accordance with the Planning (Listed Buildings and Conservation Areas) Act 1990. English Heritage, a non-departmental public body, acts as an agency of this department to administer the process and advise the department on relevant issues. There are three grades of listing status: Grade I, defined as being of "exceptional interest"; Grade II*, "particularly important buildings of more than special interest"; and Grade II, used for buildings of "special interest".

As of February 2001, there were two Grade I listed buildings, seven with Grade II* listed status, and 100 Grade II listed buildings in the Borough of Eastbourne. Other buildings have since been newly listed or upgraded, and until May 2013 the statutory list contained some anomalous entries in which buildings that no longer existed had not been delisted. The most recent new listing, the former working men's club Leaf Hall, was approved in July 2017.

== Overview of the borough and its listed buildings ==
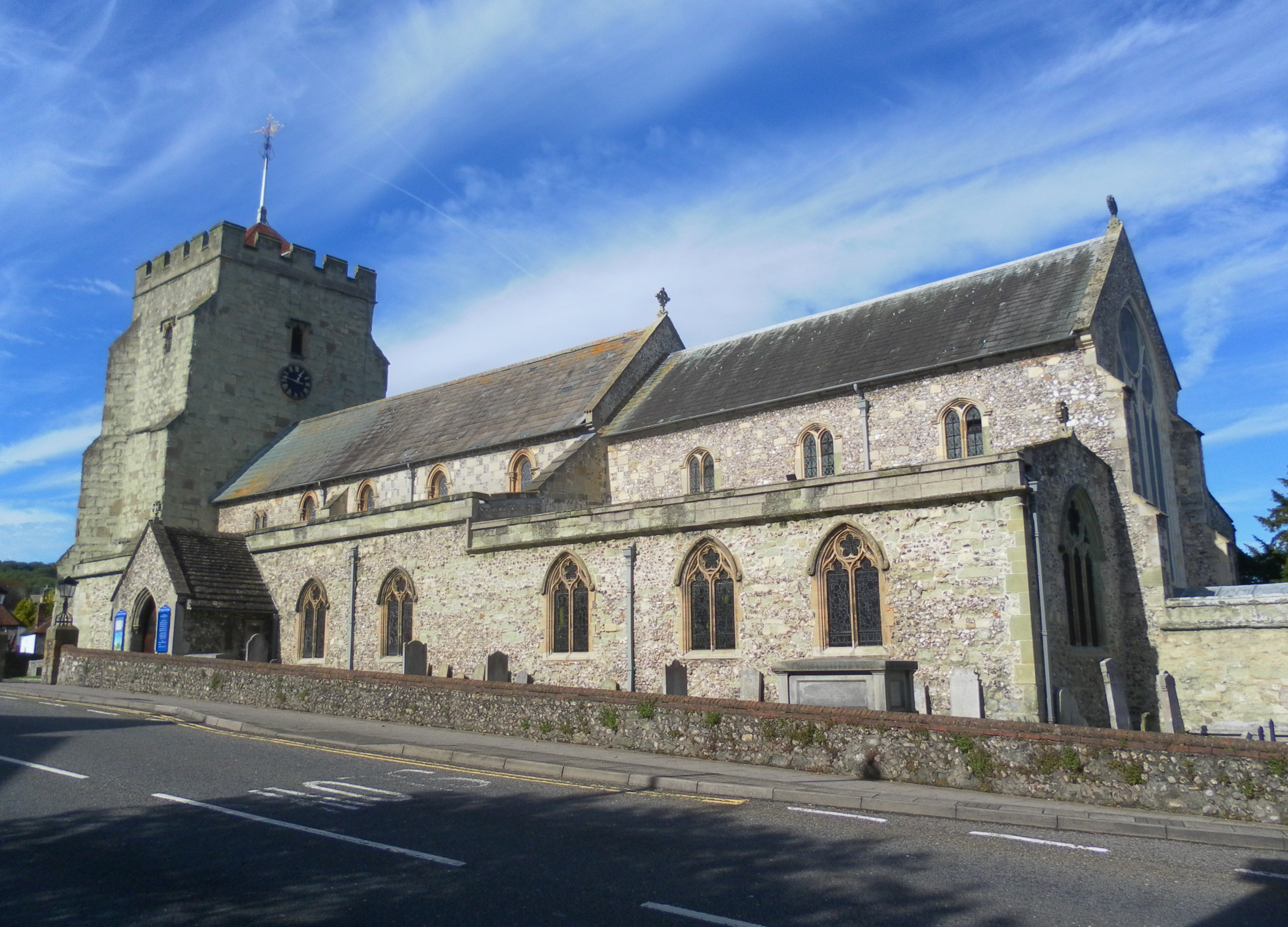
St Mary the Virgin's Church was originally the ancient parish church of the hamlet of Bourne.

Eastbourne was formed by the Victorian-era amalgamation of four farming hamlets. The principal village was Bourne (later known as Old Town), location of St Mary the Virgin's parish church and a collection of houses and other buildings dating from the medieval era to the 18th century. South Bourne consisted of buildings strung out along a route which led southeastwards to the English Channel from Bourne; the present South Street roughly follows its alignment. Sea Houses (a name first encountered in the 14th century) was further to the east, where the old houses of Marine Parade (many of them listed) now stand; and Meads was further west on higher ground. By 1780, when King George III's children stayed in Sea Houses, the area was developing into a modest but select resort at which the contemporary fashion for sea-bathing could be indulged.

As well as St Mary the Virgin's Church, the Lamb Inn, Bourne's old manor house and several cottages, some former agricultural buildings and farmhouses—mostly now converted for other uses—survive from the pre-resort era. Flint, cobblestones and red brick are the characteristic building materials of these simple Vernacular structures. Examples include Pillory Barn, Upperton Farmhouse, and the farmhouse, barn and dovecote of Motcombe Farm. A large group of similar buildings of the 18th and 19th centuries are found in Willingdon, a Downland village which has become part of the Eastbourne conurbation and whose southern section is part of the borough. Several flint-built cottages surround the village post office and stretch down Wish Hill. Nearby, Chalk Farm and its barn have been converted into a hotel and restaurant.

By the early 19th century, the south coast of England was protected against invasion by a chain of 74 Martello towers augmented by forts and other defences. Eastbourne has three Napoleonic-era Martello towers: the centrally located Wish Tower, added to during World War II, and two to the east beyond Langney. Closer to the town centre is the contemporary Eastbourne Redoubt, now a military museum. With its dry moat between concentric battlemented walls, World War II-era additions and arched recesses for storage, it is "rather a curiosity".

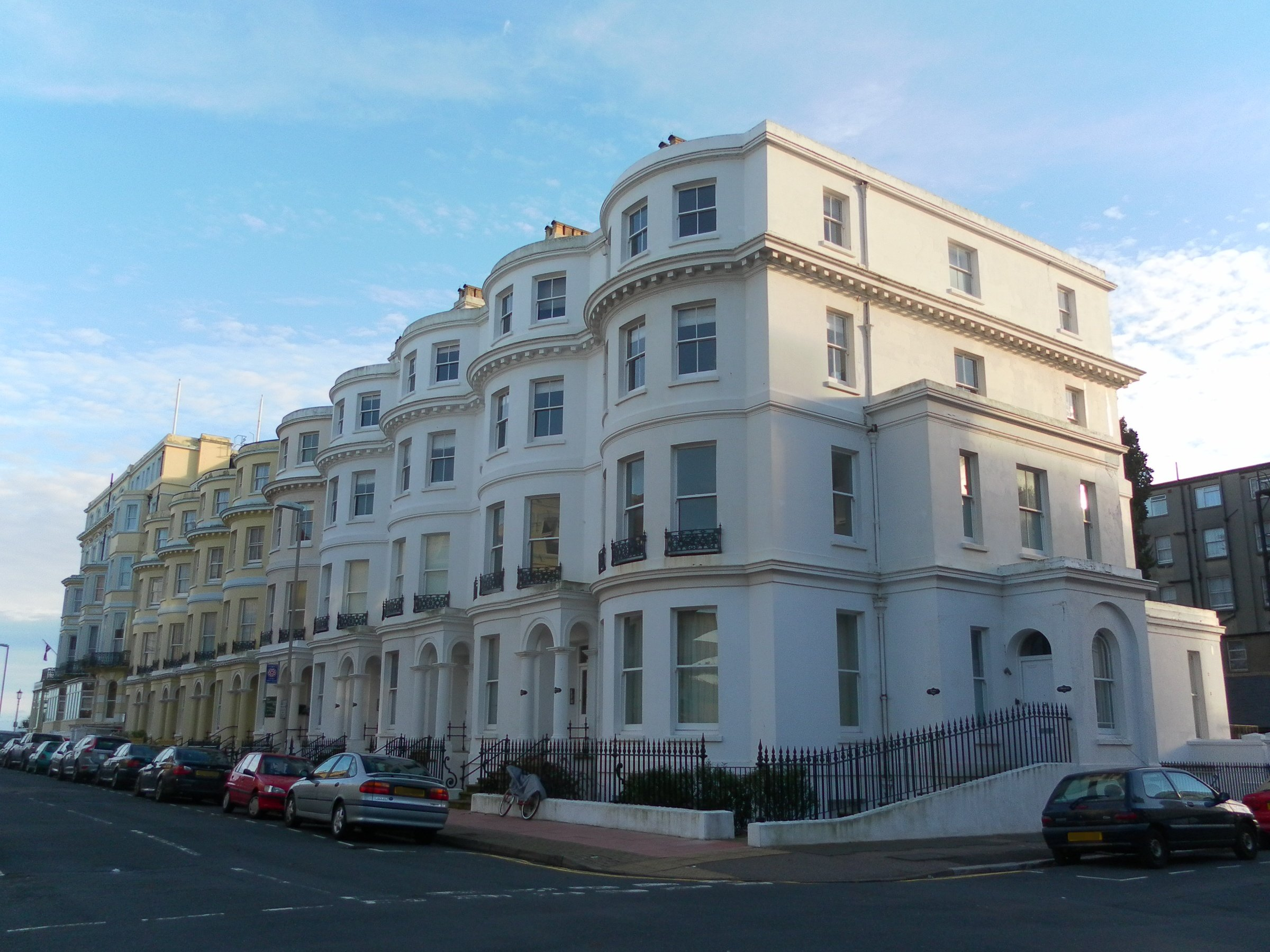
Hartington Terrace is one of many late-19th-century residential developments in Eastbourne.

Partly due to post-Napoleonic Wars stagnation and economic decline, Eastbourne was slow to move on from this early development. Another reason was the ownership of all of the surrounding land (around 6,000 acres (2,400 ha)) by the Gilbert and Cavendish families, two long-established local dynasties. Their joint decision to release land for carefully controlled development from 1850 onwards allowed Eastbourne to grow gradually into a "well-manned type of garden city, fully exploiting [its] marine setting and [its] varied and attractive landscape", thus avoiding the rapid, architecturally homogeneous growth seen in the nearby resort of Brighton or the unplanned, unfocused sprawl experienced further along the coast at Worthing. William, 2nd Earl of Burlington—designated 7th Duke of Devonshire in 1851, and resident at Compton Place—drove much of the early growth, advancing money to help schemes such as Cornfield Terrace and Seaside Road get underway, and ensuring that the sea-facing Grand Parade was developed early and designed well. The population doubled between 1861 and 1871 and again between the latter year and 1881, and many of the new buildings of that era are listed—for example, Hartington Place, Howard Place, Cavendish Place, the railway station and the theatres.

Eastbourne's continued suburban growth in the early 20th century led to the construction of several more buildings which have been awarded listed status. During redevelopment in South Street, a "Norman Shavian-style" terrace of elaborately gabled shop units replaced some older buildings, and Hastings architect Henry Ward designed the "Free Gothic" red-brick Free Church in 1903. Britain's earliest municipally operated bus service was inaugurated in the same year, and a "decorative", prominently sited bus shelter from that era survives. The Caffyn's car showroom and garage opposite Our Lady of Ransom Church also served as that locally founded company's headquarters. The "impressive" and "ebullient" brick building combines several architectural styles. The church itself was opened two years earlier, although prominent ecclesiastical architect Frederick Walters' Decorated Gothic Revival design dated from the previous decade.

== Anomalies ==
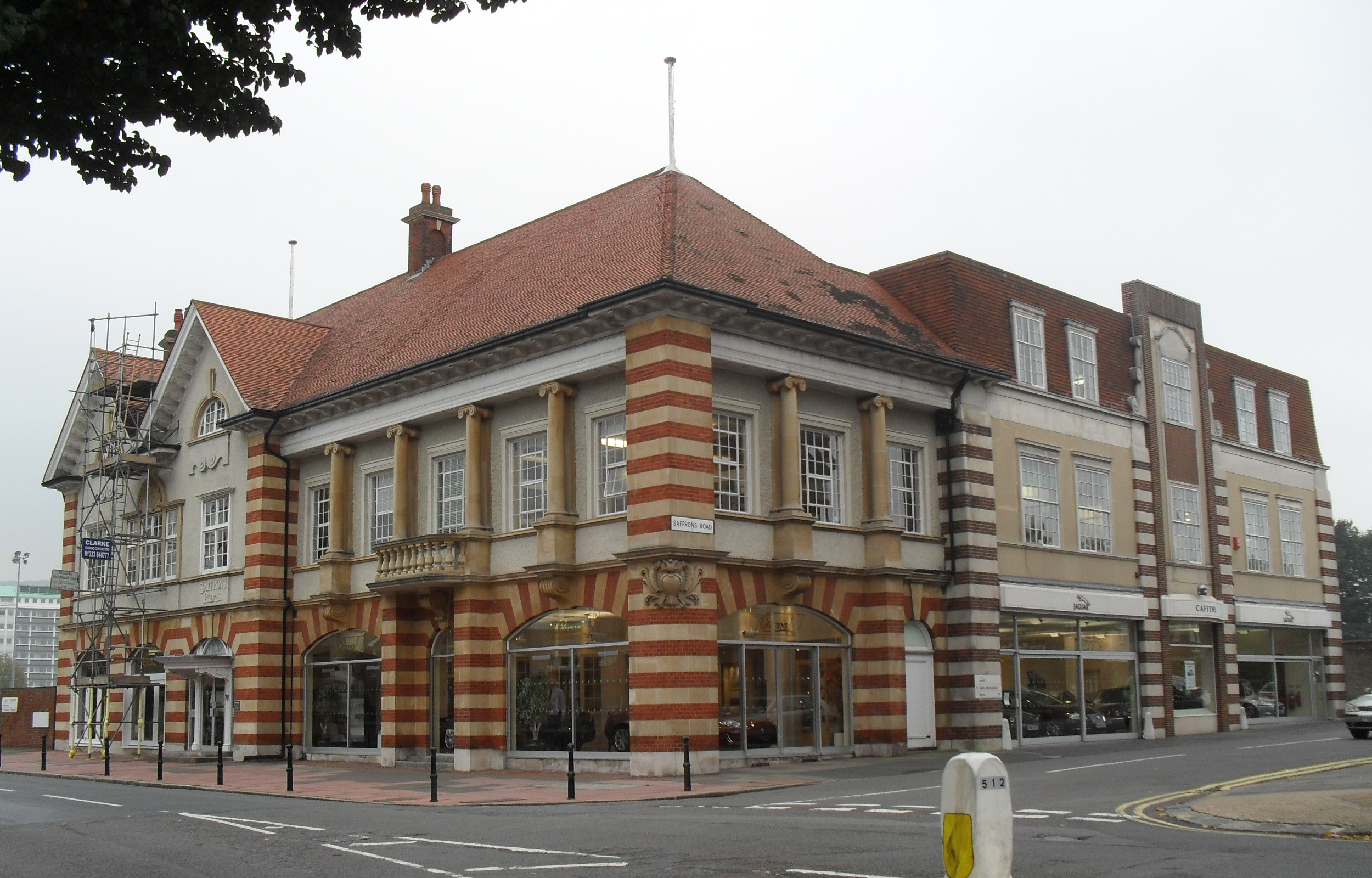
The former Caffyn's showroom does not appear on Eastbourne Borough Council's schedule of listed buildings; it was listed after the most recent update was published.

Eastbourne Borough Council maintains a list of listed buildings within its boundaries. The most recent update was published in July 2004 as part of its Eastbourne Townscape Guide Supplementary Planning Guidance document. This omits one building which has been demolished—St Peter's Church at Meads, a stone-built Early English Gothic Revival-style church demolished in the same year, 1971, as it was listed—but does not reflect updates made since 2004. Specifically, there used to be a separate grading system for Anglican churches, in which Grades A, B and C were equivalent to the standard Grades I, II* and II; English Heritage have now updated its records with the standard grades in respect of Eastbourne's churches, but the council list still shows the superseded grading system for certain churches. South Street Free Church and the former Caffyn's car showroom on Meads Road (both listed in 2009) are not shown; neither are the pair of chapels at Ocklynge Cemetery (listed in April 2013), the Tally Ho pub (listed in September 2013), the Bedfordwell pumping station (listed in March 2014), the war memorials at South Street and St Saviour's Church, both listed in February 2017, or Leaf Hall (listed July 2017). Also omitted is a Grade II*-listed set of structures on Church Street in Willingdon, which used to be listed under neighbouring Wealden district but which English Heritage now shows as part of Eastbourne borough.

Four buildings which were demolished after being listed were removed from the statutory list in May 2013. These were 1 South Street, 27 and 27a Church Street, 31 Church Street, and 18 and 20 High Street. Also until May 2013, one building in the borough was listed twice in error, under different names, by English Heritage. It is shown as 33 The Goffs in the council list, and a listing under this name exists in the National Heritage List for England; but a separate record incorrectly existed with the name 10 and 12 High Street until this listing was removed in May 2013.

== Listed buildings ==
Name	Image	Location and Coordinates	Grade	Notes	Refs
Compton Place		Meads; 50.7647°N 0.2716°E	I	A "happy survival" in its extensive grounds is the mansion remodelled by Colen Campbell in 1726–29 for Spencer Compton, 1st Earl of Wilmington. Later work in around 1800 added stucco, Tuscan columns and new windows in the side wings; the whole exterior is largely 19th-century. Rich plasterwork is found in the galleried interior. The Dukes of Devonshire later owned it.	
St Mary the Virgin's Church		Old Town; 50.7727°N 0.2657°E	I	The ancient parish church has 12th-century origins and was complete by 1500. R.C. Carpenter's restoration of 1851 changed little of the exterior appearance: a wide stone and flint building with a tall, square, castellated west tower of sandstone. The four-bay arcades with alternating pier designs are early 13th-century. Some Norman work also survives inside.	
Stables and Coachhouses at Compton Place		Meads; 50.7649°N 0.2725°E	I	Dating from the early 18th century like the house, these consist of four brick and cobblestone blocks around a courtyard, topped by roofs of slate. Two blocks (the stables) have arched porches set below pediments; the other two are lower and have parapets.	
All Saints Hospital and Chapel		Meads; 50.7545°N 0.2693°E	II*	Henry Woodyer designed this between 1867 and 1874 as a convalescent hospital for the All Saints' Sisters of the Poor, an Anglican order of nuns. The chapel, built last, has a prominent apse and is topped with a bellcote. The "fine and complete High Victorian interior" completes the entirely Gothic Revival design of the cruciform complex.	
All Souls Church		Eastbourne; 50.7703°N 0.2881°E	II*	Alfred Strong's church of 1882 combines the Italianate, Byzantine and Romanesque Revival styles and has a tall campanile and decorative apse. Inside, Byzantine-style capitals top the columns in the arcades. The exterior is of red, white and yellow brick and terracotta. The nave has seven bays, and there are arches to the chancel and apse.	
Burlington Hotel		Eastbourne; 50.7670°N 0.2916°E	II*	The only hotel to rival those in nearby Brighton, according to Pevsner, is the "monumental terrace" consisting of the Burlington and Claremont Hotels. Dating from 1851 to 1855 and spanning a 45-bay range with columns and a central pediment, it rises to four storeys and has cast iron balconies at first-floor level. The Claremont Hotel was destroyed by a large fire in November 2019.	
Congress Theatre		Eastbourne; 50.7628°N 0.2834°E	II*	Designed in 1958 by Westwood and Partners and built by Ove Arup in 1961–63, this Modernist reinforced concrete, aluminium, stock brick and glass structure is considered architecturally successful due to its "well composed and well detailed" exterior and "carefully considered" interior which delivers excellent acoustics.	
Eastbourne Pier		Eastbourne; 50.7664°N 0.2942°E	II*	Eugenius Birch's pier opened in June 1870 but was added to several times: the concert hall and main pavilion date from 1888, Noel Ridley's camera obscura and theatre were finished in 1901, and another pavilion was added by P.D. Stonham in 1925. Most of the structure is wooden with zinc-clad roofs and some cast iron. A storm in 1877 destroyed part of the structure.	
Holy Trinity Church		Eastbourne; 50.7669°N 0.2881°E	II*	Decimus Burton's chapel of ease (1837–39) to St Mary the Virgin's Church stands on Trinity Trees—originally the road between South Bourne and Seahouses, two of the old hamlets which make up modern Eastbourne. Aisles and the east end of the chancel were added in 1855 and 1861 respectively. The Early English-style flint church was parished in 1847.	
Langney Priory		Langney; 50.7964°N 0.3145°E	II*	This large house incorporates a 12th-century chapel which may have been associated with Lewes Priory. Its doorway may be a Saxon feature, and there is an ancient king post roof. The walls are laid in a chequerboard pattern of sandstone and knapped flint, and are buttressed at the sides. The façade has a late 19th-century stuccoed appearance. There are two ogee windows. A planning application for conversion into a hotel and conference venue was submitted in April 2019.	
Old Parsonage		Old Town; 50.7730°N 0.2658°E	II*	This is next to St Mary the Virgin's Church and was built in the 16th century as the manor house of the rectory. As built, it had elements of the Wealden hall house layout, with timber framing separating the main hall (and its large fireplace) from the solar and the service areas. The walls are of flint and rubble, and the windows are mullioned and transomed. The building was converted to form the parish hall.	
St Saviour's Church		Eastbourne; 50.7659°N 0.2829°E	II*	George Edmund Street's "noble church" was built on a turnip field granted to the town by the Duke of Devonshire. Founded in 1865, the red brick and ashlar building was completed in 1868. The whole church is tall, but the broach spire—the tallest in Eastbourne, and atop a tower which is barely attached to the north aisle—is the dominant feature. Details include diapering of the nave walls, mosaics and a tiled floor inside.	
Statue of Royal Sussex Regiment Soldier		Eastbourne; 50.7674°N 0.2922°E	II*	Goscombe John's bronze statue stands on a stone plinth with two commemorative plaques and two others showing scenes of military action. The statue was erected in honour of the Second Battalion, Royal Sussex Regiment.	
Walls and Gazebos at 1–11 Church Street		Willingdon; 50.7992°N 0.2536°E	II*	These structures and the gardens enclosed by them were designed by Edwin Lutyens. The north wall is of painted and red brick with round openings; to the south, the walls are of flint and lead to a terrace built of flint and with brick-quoined flint gazebos at two corners.	
All Saints Church		Eastbourne; 50.7619°N 0.2796°E	II	T.E.C. Streatfield built this Gothic Revival church of Kentish ragstone between 1878 and 1880. The foundation stone was laid on 1 November 1877. The nave was destroyed by fire in 1927 and had to be rebuilt. A tower with a cap-style spire stands at the northwest corner.	
All Souls Church Vicarage		Eastbourne; 50.7704°N 0.2876°E	II	The style of this building complements that of the elaborate church next to it: the walls are of yellow and red brick and there are arched windows with polychromatic surrounds, also of brick. The roof is tiled with slate.	
Ascham St Vincent War Memorial Arch		Meads; 50.7613°N 0.2698°E	II	This World War I memorial (1919–20) is the only surviving part of the Ascham St. Vincent's School, which stood on this site on Carlisle Road. It measures 30 by 25 feet (9.1 m × 7.6 m) and is a Perpendicular Gothic Revival structure executed in red brick and pale sandstone. A lengthy inscription commemorating 49 former pupils is carved in stone in the pediment. Floral mouldings surround this plaque. Other stone tablets to the sides list the names.	
13 and 13a Bakers Road		Old Town; 50.7729°N 0.2673°E	II	These lie perpendicular to Church Road and Bakers Road, a cul-de-sac behind it. They rise to two storeys under a common hipped roof. Both have replacement doors of different styles (at 13, it is under a hood mould and a stone lintel; 13a has its entrance set in an archway), but elsewhere original features remain: the walls are of flint with red brickwork at the quoins and the architraves of the windows.	
15 Bakers Road		Old Town; 50.7729°N 0.2670°E	II	This is a tall two-storey house with a three-window range at ground-floor level narrowing to one window above. The ground floor is built of brick and cobblestones, but the floor above is hung with slate tiles. The roof has two dormer windows.	
Bandstand and Colonnade at Grand Parade		Eastbourne; 50.7644°N 0.2896°E	II	Leslie Rosevere made this addition to the seafront in 1935. It revived the earlier Neo-Grec style and consists of a long colonnade faced in faience of various colours with a circular bandstand topped by a shallow blue roof. There are columns of the Tuscan and Composite orders. Facing the bandstand are two covered viewing areas. The "stylish and ambitious" structure replaced one dating from 1899.	
Barn at Chalk Farm Hotel		Willingdon; 50.8003°N 0.2497°E	II	This stands to the left of the Chalk Farm Hotel, another Grade II-listed building, and is mostly of flint with a tiled roof. The window and door surrounds consist of rusticated brickwork.	
Barn at Motcombe Gardens		Old Town; 50.7736°N 0.2639°E	II	Although this knapped flint structure was listed with the name Barn belonging to Chatsworth Settlement Trustees, it has now been converted into a terrace of houses. Like the adjacent dovecote and nearby farmhouse (both listed), it belonged to Motcombe Farm originally. The brick-dressed windows have timber lintels and cambered arches. The original thatched roof has been replaced with tiles.	
Beachy Head Lighthouse		Beachy Head; 50.7338°N 0.2415°E	II	This red and white striped granite-built lighthouse has an "elegant tapering shape"—the work of Sir Thomas Matthews, a prominent lighthouse engineer. Albert Havelock Case was also involved in the lengthy construction, which necessitated the use of a cofferdam and a temporary cable-car to take materials from the top of the cliff to the foreshore. Original interior features, from bunk beds to the central staircase, have been preserved inside.	
Bedfordwell Pumping Station		Upperton; 50.7761°N 0.2868°E	II	Henry Currey designed several buildings in Eastbourne, but this was his only industrial commission. The Classical-style yellow- and red-brick building, a combined pumphouse and boiler house, was built for the Eastbourne Waterworks Company between 1881 and 1883. The building is mostly intact inside and out, and possesses "impressive internal spatial quality". After the waterworks closed in 1895 because the water supply was inadequate, the council bought the premises.	
Belle Tout Lighthouse		Beachy Head; 50.7382°N 0.2144°E	II	Belle Tout became operational in 1834 but was completed in 1831 to the design of an architect called Stevenson. Beachy Head lighthouse superseded it, after which it had a variety of uses—wartime shooting practice location, tearoom and film location—before being converted for residential use in 1996. Three years later, the granite structure was moved inland using hydraulic jacks to save it from the eroding cliff edge.	
Belle Vue Hotel		Eastbourne; 50.7677°N 0.2923°E	II	This sea-facing block opposite the pier was listed as Belle Vue Hotel, Miramar Hotel and Queen's Mansions; it is now the Pier Hotel. The four-storey stuccoed Regency-style building of 1880 has a 12-window façade in a 3–6–3 formation. Small balconies, a cornice and a parapet are also apparent. The stucco at ground-floor level is rusticated.	
Borough House		Old Town; 50.7723°N 0.2667°E	II	An 18th-century house of two storeys with a five-window range, this building is of red and grey brick with a tiled roof. One remnant of an older building on the site is a buttress on the south side made of various materials including cobblestones. The south elevation is tile-hung. Two dormer windows set beneath gables emerge from the roof.	
4 Borough Lane		Old Town; 50.7724°N 0.2667°E	II	This building was originally two houses. Its 16th-century origins have been obscured by repeated alterations, including work in the 18th century which changed the whole of the northern section. The upper storey is jettied. Most windows are casements, although there are later sashes as well. The interior is timber-framed.	
Brodie Hall		Roselands; 50.7745°N 0.2967°E	II	This stands in front and to the left of Christ Church on Seaside. A single-storey flint-walled structure, it was originally the church school. The roof is of slate, and courses of yellow and red brick run through the flints.	
Bus Shelter at Seaside		Roselands; 50.7768°N 0.2976°E	II	Erected at some point between 1899 and 1910 at the Seaside–Whitley Road junction, this "simple yet decorative" weatherboarded building (on a brick plinth) has historic as well as architectural interest: Eastbourne Corporation's Motor Omnibus Department, responsible for its installation, is believed to be the world's first municipal bus operator. The hipped roof is tiled.	
Caffyns Garage (former)		Eastbourne; 50.7664°N 0.2772°E	II	The Caffyn brothers opened their first garage in Eastbourne in 1903, and the name remains familiar across southeast England in the 21st century as the company operates many car showrooms. It is based in this building, erected as a garage and showroom in 1911 to the "busy [and] ebullient" design of H. Woolnough. The two-storey red and yellow brick structure has Baroque, Classical and Arts and Crafts elements.	
1–24 Cavendish Place		Eastbourne; 50.7679°N 0.2917°E	II	These Regency-style bow-fronted houses are late examples of that style: they date from the early 1850s. There is one window to each of four storeys; only the top floor is flat-fronted. Other features include arched doorways and iron balconies.	
25–33 Cavendish Place		Eastbourne; 50.7689°N 0.2917°E	II	This terrace of five houses lies further inland and on the opposite side of the road to numbers 1–24, but apart from their ground floors being flat-fronted rather than bowed they are identical.	
35–49 Cavendish Place		Eastbourne; 50.7695°N 0.2913°E	II	These also date from the early 1850s and share the same features as their neighbours on Cavendish Place.	
Central Methodist Church		Eastbourne; 50.7689°N 0.2888°E	II	Unusually for an early 20th-century Nonconformist church, Carlos Crisford's 1907–08 building is in the Decorated Gothic style and has a steeple. It replaced a similar building of 1863–64 on the same site, which had succeeded a chapel founded in 1809 in Grove Road. The present church was built with attached schoolrooms, which survive on the Langney Road façade. Ashlar and stone rubble laid in courses are the main materials. There is a large seven-light window with tracery above the entrance.	
Chalk Farm Hotel		Willingdon; 50.8005°N 0.2497°E	II	This complex consists of a hotel, a restaurant in the adjacent barn (also listed) and a centre for people with learning disabilities, focused on training and providing service-industry employment for them. The main building dates from the early 18th century and has a plastered façade over flintwork. The two storeys have a four-window range all set in straight-headed surrounds. There are dormer windows in the tiled roof. The entrance is set under a bracketed hood mould.	
Christ Church		Roselands; 50.7743°N 0.2969°E	II	Eastbourne's "fishermen's church" was designed by Benjamin Ferrey in 1859. Early visitors included Princess Alice and Lewis Carroll, who preached there under his real name of Reverend Charles Dodgson. The Gothic Revival flint church was altered in 1870, a chancel was added in 1879, and G.H. Shackle's elaborate war memorial chapel dates from 1922. The tower took nine years to complete.	
1 and 2 Church Lane		Old Town; 50.7727°N 0.2645°E	II	Standing on "an important site facing" the ancient parish church of St Mary the Virgin, this pair of attached cottages and the walls around them are built of cobblestones with copious use of red brick around the doors, windows and on the quoins and eaves. The casement windows are set under straight heads, and the doors are simple timber structures.	
3–5 Church Lane		Old Town; 50.7728°N 0.2643°E	II	Although listed under three numbers, this building was said to be "in [the] process of being converted into one dwelling" at the time of listing in 1971. The two-storey building has a three-window range with replacement casement windows set below brick architraves. There is stucco to the rear gables and the side, in which a modern door has been built. One side is supported by flint buttresses, and the walls are of flint cobbles.	
1–24 Cornfield Terrace		Eastbourne; 50.7656°N 0.2849°E	II	This "pleasant terrace of small houses", most of which now have modern shop units in the lowest of their three storeys, has an 1820s appearance but actually dates from the first half of the 1850s. The stuccoed façades each have two windows to each floor, a string-course above the ground floor and Doric-style pilasters rising from there to a cornice and a parapet (although these details are different at numbers 11–16, which are taller).	
Cottage at Langney Priory		Langney; 50.7966°N 0.3147°E	II	This used to be the stables associated with the adjacent Langney Priory. The cobble-walled building has been converted into a cottage in the Sussex Vernacular style.	
Court House		Old Town; 50.7733°N 0.2691°E	II	This 17th-century cobble-faced and brick building stands on the site of a courthouse associated with the ancient manor of Bourne (now Eastbourne's Old Town). The brick eastern side dates from an 1878 remodelling, as does the tiled roof. Inside there is extensive oak panelling. The façade has three equal gables.	
De Walden Court		Meads; 50.7587°N 0.2698°E	II	"An impressive Italianate-style house" possibly inspired by Chatsworth, this is now flats and began as two houses—Little De Walden (1892) and Big de Walden (1884). F.G. Cooke and A.E. Thompson designed both. The building is mostly of brick and sandstone; the former Little de Walden has a full-height canted bay window in a sandstone surround.	
Devonshire Park Theatre		Eastbourne; 50.7632°N 0.2849°E	II	The "very conservative" exterior of this Italianate building dates from 1884, when Henry Currey designed it, but Frank Matcham was responsible for the interior: this was remodelled in 1903 and is unchanged since then. The walls are of stucco and the roof has slate tiles. Twin four-storey lead-roofed towers dominate the exterior and flank the pedimented entrance.	
Dovecote at Motcombe Gardens		Old Town; 50.7741°N 0.2641°E	II	This is a circular tower-style dovecote with a tiled roof and walls of knapped flint. The entrance has steps and is buttressed.	
Drinking Fountain at Seahouses Square		Eastbourne; 50.7714°N 0.2946°E	II	This drinking fountain stood in two other locations nearby before being moved to this sea-facing square in 2000 as part of a thorough restoration. The structure dates from 1865 and was paid for by Elizabeth Curling, a local resident. The stone plinth supports a cast iron fountain topped with a gas lamp, a replica of which has been reinstated, supported on two cast iron dolphins. Decorative elements include panels with Biblical inscriptions and fasces.	
Eastbourne Heritage Centre		Eastbourne; 50.7627°N 0.2851°E	II	The architect of this building is unconfirmed, but Eastbourne's first mayor George A. Wallis was apparently involved—possibly with help from Henry Currey. Both men were associated with the Dukes of Devonshire, for whom it was provided as a house for the manager of the Devonshire Park and Baths Company. The octagonal tower at the corner of the Italianate house was intended to bear a flag. It rises to three storeys, while the house itself has two. The walls are of brick with some stucco, and the roof is slate. The interior was opened out in 1983 to make room for a heritage centre.	
Eastbourne Railway Station		Eastbourne; 50.7717°N 0.2759°E	II	The "inexorable multitude of funny motifs" on the 1861 yellow-brick railway terminus include a French pavilion-style roof and various medieval-style elements. The London, Brighton and South Coast Railway architect and engineer F.D. Bannister designed it. A clock tower with a steep pyramid roof sits at the junction of the two main sections. Original glazed canopies survive.	
Eastbourne Signal Box		Eastbourne; 50.7710°N 0.2848°E	II	The revolutionary Saxby and Farmer signalling system, which enhanced railway safety by interlocking points and signals, was closely linked with the London, Brighton and South Coast Railway: John Saxby's earliest work was done on the company's lines. Eastbourne signal box dates from 1882, by which time the station was an important terminus and junction. The box was the largest of its kind ("Type 5") in England along with that at Chichester railway station, and remains "the best preserved". The building has brown and red brickwork, sash windows, weatherboarding and timber framing.	
Eastbourne Town Hall		Eastbourne; 50.7666°N 0.2777°E	II	W. Tadman Foulkes adopted no specific architectural style for his large, prominently sited town hall, built between 1884 and 1886; Nikolaus Pevsner described it as "Free Renaissance". A large clock tower (whose clock was installed in 1892 by Gillett & Johnston) dominates the building, but it is not centrally placed; the left and right sections are different in appearance and symmetry as well.	
Elysium Cinema (former)		Roselands; 50.7742°N 0.2956°E	II	Now empty and for sale, this opened in 1914 as the Eastbourne Picture Theatre. Later names included the Elysium (1921) and the Gaiety (1936); the building was then sold and became a bingo hall. English Heritage consider it "an unusually complete example" of a cinema of that date, with particular emphasis on the extensive scheme of plaster ornamentation and moulding. The symmetrical gabled façade is Queen Anne style with wooden-framed windows.	
Flint Halls		Old Town; 50.7726°N 0.2639°E	II	This was a 19th-century school in the heart of the Old Town, and some features remain from its educational use. It is a single-storey l-shaped flint and brick building with a roof of tiles and slate. The main section has a large gable with bargeboards and a gabled porch.	
4 Furness Road		Eastbourne; 50.7659°N 0.2808°E	II	The side elevation, facing the road, is stuccoed, but this house (which lies perpendicular to the road) is mostly of cobbles with some red brickwork. There are three windows to each storey.	
6, 8 and 10 Furness Road		Eastbourne; 50.7659°N 0.2808°E	II	Like their neighbour at number 4, this terrace of cottages is perpendicular to Furness Road. The ground floor has cobbles but there is stucco above. Brick (on the window surrounds) and tiles (to the roof) are also used.	
Gate Posts and Wall at Eastbourne College		Meads; 50.7636°N 0.2814°E	II	At the College Road entrance to Eastbourne College is a long flint wall and a set of gate posts inscribed h r thomson, headmaster mcm–mcmv.	
Gazebo at 1 Matlock Road		Meads; 50.7564°N 0.2674°E	II	English Heritage speculate about the origins of this 18th-century gazebo which is now set in the garden of a house built in 1894; it is in the heart of Meads village, and "presumably" belonged to a now demolished farmhouse. It is a two-storey ornamental structure of cobbles and red brick with a pyramid roof.	
Greystone Haugh		Meads; 50.7564°N 0.2674°E	II	This is an l-shaped house of the 18th century. Built of cobbles with a cement-faced ground floor and stucco around the windows (five per floor), it also has an elaborate doorway consisting of a pediment supported on Doric pilasters enclosing a glass-panelled door with a semicircular fanlight. The roof has two dormers and is laid with slates.	
5–21 Hartington Place		Eastbourne; 50.7656°N 0.2889°E	II	Some Regency elements exist in this four-storey terrace of stuccoed houses, despite their post-Regency date (they were built in the second half of the 1850s). Each house has cast iron balconies and an arched porch supported on Doric columns, all linked by cornices. The other storeys are divided by string-courses and a modillion cornice.	
Hodeslea		Meads; 50.7567°N 0.2722°E	II	This detached villa on Staveley Road in Meads has historical rather than architectural significance: it was built in 1890 by Frederick Waller for Thomas Henry Huxley. Money was raised by the public. Inside, only the library survives in original condition.	
1–6 and 9–12 Howard Square		Eastbourne; 50.7636°N 0.2867°E	II	These have been attributed to George A. Wallis, the first mayor of Eastbourne who is also believed to have designed the Grade II-listed building which is now Eastbourne Heritage Centre. The houses form a sea-facing square of unusually late date: 1874. Few changes to the "mildly Italianate" buildings are in evidence. Each has four storeys with a three-window range, the centre of which is narrower. Each entrance is flanked by pilasters which support a cornice below the first floor.	
K6 Telephone Kiosk at Devonshire Park Theatre		Eastbourne; 50.7633°N 0.2853°E	II	This is a telephone kiosk of the standard K6 type developed in 1935 to the design of Giles Gilbert Scott. They are square structures with a slightly dome-shaped roof, made entirely of cast iron with glass panels in the door and walls. This example stands to the left of the entrance of Devonshire Park Theatre.	
K6 Telephone Kiosk at Marine Parade		Eastbourne; 50.7674°N 0.2927°E	II	This is a telephone kiosk of the standard K6 type developed in 1935 to the design of Giles Gilbert Scott. They are square structures with a slightly dome-shaped roof, made entirely of cast iron with glass panels in the door and walls. This example stands next to Eastbourne Pier and was listed in 2010, at which time English Heritage described it as "a milestone of 20th-century industrial design".	
K6 Telephone Kiosk at Wish Hill		Willingdon; 50.7983°N 0.2514°E	II	This is a telephone kiosk of the standard K6 type developed in 1935 to the design of Giles Gilbert Scott. They are square structures with a slightly dome-shaped roof, made entirely of cast iron with glass panels in the door and walls. This example stands next to Willingdon post office and at the centre of a group of other Grade II-listed buildings.	
K6 Telephone Kiosks at Holy Trinity Church		Eastbourne; 50.7672°N 0.2882°E	II	These are telephone kiosks of the standard K6 type developed in 1935 to the design of Giles Gilbert Scott. They are square structures with a slightly dome-shaped roof, made entirely of cast iron with glass panels in the door and walls. These examples stand in a line on Trinity Trees outside Holy Trinity Church.	
King's Arms		Roselands; 50.7751°N 0.2962°E	II	The architect of this pub, built in about 1900, is believed to be A. Dixon. The building is on a corner site and has a prominent octagonal corner tower topped with a copper roof and cupola. A timber verandah with a heavily bracketed copper canopy spans the main façade at first-floor level. There is elaborate decoration around the entrance, including marble, tiles, engraved glass and inscribed panels. Intricate plasterwork also survives inside.	
Lamb Inn		Old Town; 50.7727°N 0.2670°E	II	"A dolled-up front", in Nikolaus Pevsner's words, conceals the ancient timber-framed interior of this 16th-century inn. Surviving medieval features include the jettied upper storey, the main door and a vaulted undercroft with original timbers in the ceiling. The roof is tiled.	
Leaf Hall		Eastbourne; 50.7711°N 0.2951°E	II	Robert Knott Blessley designed this working men's club in 1863–64 on behalf of William Laidler Leaf, a Londoner who had a second home in Eastbourne. It served an area populated by fishermen, but by the 1880s it had been opened to all. The land was donated by the Duke of Devonshire. The brown-brick building has polychrome decoration and is in a "Continental" Gothic Revival style. The "landmark" corner clock tower is of four stages and has a Whitechapel Bell Foundry bell.	
Malthouse Cottage, Old Barn Close		Willingdon; 50.7982°N 0.2516°E	II	This is a 17th-century flint cottage with a jettied upper storey which is clad in stucco and partly weatherboarded. The windows are sashes, and the tiled roof is hipped.	
Malthouse Cottages, Wish Hill		Willingdon; 50.7942°N 0.2553°E	II	This terrace of four cottages dates from 1826. The walls are of flint with extensive areas of brick, especially on the architraves and quoins. Each cottage has two arched sash windows on each of their two storeys. The doors are set under similar cambered arches. The roof spans the whole building and is of slate.	
Manor House (former Towner Art Gallery)		Old Town; 50.7722°N 0.2670°E	II	The Towner Gallery moved out of Eastbourne's former manor house, its home since 1923, in 2007. The two-storey building dates from 1743 and presents a seven-window façade to the street. The walls are of grey brick with some red brickwork. Columns around the doorway and supporting one bay window have been described as Doric or Tuscan.	
6 Marine Parade		Eastbourne; 50.7684°N 0.2939°E	II	Also known by the name Seaside, this three-storey house was built in the 1780s but was refronted in approximately the 1840s. The stuccoed façade has a two-window range; one window on the first floor is a bay. The roof is of slate.	
7 Marine Parade		Eastbourne; 50.7685°N 0.2940°E	II	Like its neighbour, this rises to three storeys and has a two-window range, but it dates in its entirety from the 1840s and has a nearly full-height bay front to the left. The stepped entrance is right-aligned and is flanked with Doric pilasters. There is a canopied iron balcony at first-floor level and a dormer in the tiled roof.	
27 and 28 Marine Parade		Eastbourne; 50.7697°N 0.2946°E	II	These houses stand on the site of an earlier building in which the "Society of the People Called Methodists" was founded in 1803 to encourage the spread of Methodism. It was also that denomination's first place of worship in the Eastbourne area. The present buildings were erected in about 1840 and rise to three storeys with a narrow full-height bay window. At first-floor level is an iron balcony with Doric columns below.	
35 and 36 Marine Parade		Eastbourne; 50.7702°N 0.2950°E	II	Two "rather plain" houses of approximately the 1840s, these have their roofs hidden behind a cornice and parapet. Each house has three storeys with two windows to each, small iron balconies at first-floor level and a string-course above. Fanlights survive above the doors.	
37 Marine Parade		Eastbourne; 50.7704°N 0.2950°E	II	This detached cottage is a simple, plain cobblestone-walled building partly faced with cement. It dates from the early 19th century and has a single window to both storeys with a dormer in the attic space above.	
38 Marine Parade		Eastbourne; 50.7704°N 0.2951°E	II	This has a roughcast façade and a tile-hung side elevation, but otherwise resembles its neighbour at number 37. The tiled roof is hipped.	
39 and 40 Marine Parade		Eastbourne; 50.7705°N 0.2950°E	II	Number 40 rises to three storeys and is attached by way of an extended hipped roof to the shorter number 39. The roof drops down to become a mansard. The whole building has walls of red and grey brick, and the roof is tiled.	
Martello Tower east of Langney Priory (at TQ6437601226)		Sovereign Harbour; 50.7873°N 0.3306°E	II	This is Martello tower number 66, one in the long chain erected along the south coast of England. It is a circular concrete structure with space for guns to be mounted on the roof.	
Martello Tower east of Langney Priory (at TQ6470402188)		Sovereign Harbour; 50.7959°N 0.3357°E	II	This is Martello tower number 64, one in the long chain erected along the south coast of England. It is a circular concrete structure with space for guns to be mounted on the roof.	
Meads Place		Meads; 50.7588°N 0.2687°E	II	Prominent at first-floor level on the façade of this 18th-century house is a sundial set between pilasters and below a pediment, resembling "a tablet or wall tombstone". There is a three-window range and a further three dormer windows in the slate-tiled hipped roof. There is a wooden modillion cornice below this. The walls are of grey and red brick.	
Miria		Willingdon; 50.7984°N 0.2512°E	II	Now in commercial use, this was built as three cottages in the 18th century. The building has a three-window range and three modern doorways (in a Tudor style) at ground-floor level. The doors and windows are set in brick architraves with rustication. The quoins are also of brick, but flint is the main building material.	
Motcombe Farm House		Old Town; 50.7745°N 0.2649°E	II	Built in the early 19th century, this cobblestone-walled former farmhouse has a five-window range; the westernmost two windows are modern additions. There is red brickwork around the windows and on the quoins. The arched entrance has a semicircular fanlight above.	
Ocklynge Cemetery Chapel		Ocklynge; 50.7777°N 0.2647°E	II	Christ Church's architect Benjamin Ferrey designed this pair of Gothic Revival chapels in 1857 as a single composition, but the Anglican chapel is taller and grander than the Nonconformist one. The latter is now a storeroom, but the Anglican chapel retains its wooden fittings, flint-walled porch and encaustic tile floor. It also has a large buttressed bellcote. The 4-acre (1.6 ha) Ocklynge Cemetery opened in 1855.	
Ocklynge Manor		Ocklynge; 50.7779°N 0.2680°E	II	Now a bed and breakfast establishment, this was built in the early 19th century and was once lived in by Mabel Lucie Attwell, who is commemorated by a blue plaque. The two-storey house is stuccoed	
Old Bakehouse Cottage		Old Town; 50.7746°N 0.2664°E	II	This cottage was refronted in the 19th-century but was built two centuries earlier and is timber-framed; the original structure is concealed behind stucco. Windows are set in an irregular pattern on both storeys, and there is a mixture of sashes and casements. The roof is laid with tiles.	
Old Manor House		Hampden Park; 50.7927°N 0.2618°E	II	This has also been known as Ratton Farm in the past. The l-shaped building is mostly late-17th or early-18th century, but the windows may have been altered in the mid-19th century. The five-bay façade has cobblestones and painted brickwork. The door is set below a bracketed hood mould.	
Old Parsonage Barn		Old Town; 50.7730°N 0.2662°E	II	This stands in the grounds of the Grade II*-listed Old Parsonage building and was originally associated with it. New windows have been inserted and a garage has been built into the east elevation, but the structure and appearance are largely 16th-century: original timber framing survives, and the upper floor is jettied.	
Our Lady of Ransom Church		Eastbourne; 50.7661°N 0.2778°E	II	Frederick Walters designed this Roman Catholic church in the Decorated Gothic style in 1900–01. The Bath Stone and ashlar exterior conceals an impressively elaborate interior. Additions included a tower with a steeple in 1912, additional chapels in 1920 and a baptistery in 1967 (by architect A.J. McDonough).	
Paradise Belvedere		Meads; 50.7622°N 0.2599°E	II	Built in the 18th century—possibly the 1740s, and most likely the second quarter of that century—this gazebo is associated with Compton Place and gives good views of the estate across its grounds. It is an "elegant and well-proportioned" Palladian-style structure of flint, red brick and stone. There is an arched recess for seating.	
Pelham Cottage		Willingdon; 50.7984°N 0.2514°E	II	The village bakery of Willingdon was housed in this cottage, presumed to be one of the oldest buildings in the area. The front elevation has seen less alteration than the rear section: the walls are of flint with red brickwork to the quoins and architraves, and the roof is tiled.	
Pillory Barn		Old Town; 50.7725°N 0.2629°E	II	Now converted and no longer in use as a barn—at the time it was listed in 1971 it was a timber warehouse—this dates from 1813 and has cobbled walls, a tiled roof and some brickwork. The original carriage arch is now glazed but retains a date-stone above it.	
Ratton Manor Gate House		Ratton Village; 50.7918°N 0.2514°E	II	Ratton Manor no longer stands and no evidence remains of its associated farm, but the gate house to the manor survives amid 20th-century housing. Dating from the 15th century, it has jettying and timber framing, a stone chimney-breast and an old wooden door. Fittings such as the roof and windows (except one) are modern.	
Redoubt Fort		Roselands; 50.7742°N 0.3008°E	II	This is contemporary with the nearby Martello towers, dating from 1806 when Napoleonic raids were a threat. Two circular walls surround a moat; the inner section has several recesses for billeting soldiers and storing ammunition. It was fortified further in World War II when pillboxes and other structures were added.	
Royal Hippodrome Theatre		Eastbourne; 50.7693°N 0.2927°E	II	Architect Charles J. Phipps designed this variety theatre in 1883; it is one of the oldest such theatres in England. There have been several rounds of alterations, but the original Italianate design survives. Much of the interior was remodelled in the 1930s. Exterior features include pilasters of various orders and a dentil cornice.	
St Elisabeth's Church (former)		Downside; 50.7831°N 0.2549°E	II	Peter Dulvey Stonham's gigantic unadorned Gothic red-brick church was consecrated on 19 February 1938. The will of its reclusive donor stipulated her £80,000 had to be spent in the town, so the diocese's desire to build new churches in Brighton with the legacy was unfulfilled. Design faults in the construction of walls and roof affected the structural integrity, and the church closed in 2003; the adjacent parish hall (also listed) is now used for worship.	
St Elisabeth's Church Hall		Downside; 50.7834°N 0.2547°E	II	After the 1930s church was condemned and declared redundant, the congregation moved to the adjacent church hall (built in the Neo-Georgian style at the same time as the old church) and converted it into a place of worship. It opened as a combined church and community centre in July 2004, and structural additions are planned.	
St Elisabeth's Church Vicarage		Downside; 50.7829°N 0.2548°E	II	This was designed and built at the same time as St Elisabeth's Church Hall, whose Neo-Georgian style it matches, and St Elisabeth's Church which stands in the middle of the group. Peter Dulvey Stonham and A.R.G. Fleming were responsible for the red-brick building, which has a seven-window range and prominent chimneys. There are both casement and sash windows.	
St Margaret's		Meads; 50.7602°N 0.2654°E	II	J.N. Randall-Vining designed this house on Carlisle Road in 1911. Its "outstanding and complete interior" reflects design elements used at the Liberty store in London; the house was occupied by one of the company's directors. The exterior has bricks, tile-hanging and some timber framing, and the roof has two gables; there is also a gabled porch. Inside there is oak panelling, plaster mouldings, ceramic tiles and other Art Nouveau features.	
St Mary's Church		Hampden Park; 50.7969°N 0.2717°E	II	Hampden Park's first church was a chapel of ease to Willingdon, built in a Vernacular style in 1908. The bombed building was replaced by Edward Maufe's simplified Perpendicular Gothic church of 1952–54, which became one of the first postwar buildings to be listed. It has white-painted brickwork, a low tower and a small bell tower.	
St Mary's House		Old Town; 50.7728°N 0.2669°E	II	This 19th-century cottage backs on to number 15 Bakers Road, another listed house. The two storeys have a five-window range, and there are three dormer windows in the slate-tiled roof. The panelled door is set below a scrolled hood mould. Roughcast covers the walls.	
24a St Mary's Road		Old Town; 50.7754°N 0.2648°E	II	Set back behind St Mary's Road, this is a survivor from the 18th century. The walls are of cobblestones with brick quoins and courses. There are three windows set in architraves with rustication at first-floor level; below, two similar windows flank a porch with a prominent porch consisting of a hood mould and two timber piers.	
St Michael and All Angels Church		Ocklynge; 50.7784°N 0.2644°E	II	G.E.S. Streatfield's large Decorated Gothic church, of flint and with a tower at the west end, is early 20th-century. The chancel, Lady chapel and vestry were built in 1901; a temporary metal structure served as the nave until 1911, when a permanent nave with aisles replaced it. The roof is of slate from Westmorland.	
Sea View		Willingdon; 50.7982°N 0.2512°E	II	Built in the 18th century and faced with stucco, this two-storey houses faces the Wish Hill post office and other listed buildings in the centre of Willingdon. The tiled roof is hipped.	
20 Seaside		Eastbourne; 50.7700°N 0.2943°E	II	At the time of its listing, this was a restaurant. Built as Livingstone House in the early 19th century, it is a partly rusticated stucco-faced two-storey house with a four-window range and four dormer windows in the mansard roof. At first-floor level, the easternmost window is a bay.	
48–70 Seaside		Eastbourne; 50.7708°N 0.2944°E	II	This stuccoed Italianate-style terrace dates from the 1860s or 1870s. Some houses are now in commercial use. The slate roof hides behind a continuous parapet. Each house has a bay window rising through all three storeys, and most have a "very elaborate" iron balcony at first-floor level.	
Shepherd's Hut at Birling Farm		Near East Dean; 50.7550°N 0.2215°E	II	Listed for its "very good" representation of "a vanished way of life", this 19th-century flint and brick-quoined structure is part of Birling Farm on the South Downs above Eastbourne (but still within its boundaries). The simple interior consists of wooden benches and a bunk bed.	
3, 5 and 7 South Street		Eastbourne; 50.7665°N 0.2787°E	II	This short terrace of early 19th-century shops rise to three storeys and have straight-headed sash windows. The most ornate decoration is on number 5, whose door is set below a fanlight and between moulded pilasters.	
41a South Street		Eastbourne; 50.7667°N 0.2805°E	II	This forms an l-shape around a corner behind South Street. It was built as a combined shop and workshop in the early 19th century; the workshop section has prominent windows. The materials are stucco and brick.	
101–119 South Street		Eastbourne; 50.7667°N 0.2841°E	II	"Prominently situated" on this town-centre road, this terrace of shops with living accommodation above have elements of Norman Shaw's favoured architectural elements, such as tile-hanging, large gables and decorative exterior panelling. The gables have large projecting bargeboards. The windows above the shopfronts are intricately detailed two-storey bays.	
South Street Free Church		Eastbourne; 50.7666°N 0.2795°E	II	Henry Ward's Congregational church of 1903 now has an Evangelical congregation which is part of the Countess of Huntingdon's Connexion denomination. The church, of red brick with stone banding and dressings, was listed by English Heritage in May 2009. The "Free Gothic"-style structure stands on the site of a blacksmith's forge. In 1908, a local undertakers firm built their premises in a similar style adjoining the church's west wall.	
Stables and Motor House (former) at Trevin Towers		Meads; 50.7622°N 0.2676°E	II	Built in a similar "Vernacular Revival" style to the house originally called Trevin Towers, these also now form part of the Eastbourne campus of the University of Brighton. The stables date from about 1894 and are of red brick and tile. Most windows are casements. The former motor house is a single-storey brick structure from 1921; it retains its panelled interior.	
Statue of 7th Duke of Devonshire		Eastbourne; 50.7647°N 0.2889°E	II	William Cavendish, 7th Duke of Devonshire was instrumental in Eastbourne's Victorian development, and his monument erected in 1901 to the design of Goscombe John "ought to be observed" according to Pevsner. The duke, who was the Chancellor of the University of Cambridge, wears his robes of office and is seated on a chair. The bronze statue is on an ashlar base.	
Statue of 8th Duke of Devonshire		Eastbourne; 50.7601°N 0.2844°E	II	Spencer Cavendish, 8th Duke of Devonshire was also a Cambridge University Chancellor and is wearing the appropriate robes in this depiction, but here he stands facing the Grand Hotel. The plinth is of granite. The statue was erected in 1910.	
Stream Cottage		Willingdon; 50.7974°N 0.2520°E	II	This early 19th-century house is in the Sussex Vernacular style with cobblestone walls and a tiled roof. The windows and door are set in cambered arches with architraves detailed in red brick.	
Tally Ho Inn		Old Town; 50.7722°N 0.2619°E	II	Brighton-based architect John Leopold Denman designed many pubs for the Kemp Town Brewery. This example from 1927 is a "striking" building on a corner site, inspired by the Arts and Crafts and Sussex Vernacular styles. Much of the intricate original detail survives. Red brick is the main material, but tiles and knapped flint also feature.	
The Cottage		Meads; 50.7644°N 0.2745°E	II	Now a small single-storey cottage, this was built in the 19th century as a school. There is a dormer window in the slate roof. The walls are of cobblestones with some yellow brickwork and a wooden bargeboard on the gable end.	
11 The Goffs		Old Town; 50.7713°N 0.2730°E	II	Peter Dulvey Stonham was a prolific architect around Eastbourne: several of his buildings are listed. He designed three houses on The Goffs around 1910, but this is the only survivor. This "carefully asymmetrical Arts and Crafts-style house" was erected in 1910 for a solicitor and remained in single occupancy until it was converted into flats in 1964. Brown brickwork is offset by stone details, tiles and some timber framing to the gables.	
33 The Goffs		Old Town; 50.7721°N 0.2697°E	II	Originally known as Gildredge Manor House, this has been significantly and frequently remodelled since the 17th century but retains some medieval features. The façade is roughcast, and the hipped roof has tiles and slates. "Rather coarse" Renaissance-style Murals were uncovered inside in 1957 during the building's conversion into flats.	
The Hermitage		Old Town; 50.7709°N 0.2675°E	II	One of several listed gazebos in Eastbourne, this Gothic-style octagonal structure stands in the extensive grounds of the old Manor House in the Old Town. It has a roughcast exterior over brickwork and a thatched roof topped with a finial, and dates from the 18th century. The windows on each face are set in ogee-headed openings.	
Trevin Towers		Meads; 50.7620°N 0.2679°E	II	Built for an author called J.J. Hissey, apparently largely to his design, this "Vernacular Revival-style" red-brick house was built in 1894. It is now owned by the University of Brighton. The entrance has a prominent porte-cochère, and towers, gables and other projections (some with timber framing) survive on this "exuberant" building, whose original interior also survives in good condition.	
67 and 69 Upper Kings' Drive		Willingdon; 50.7975°N 0.2519°E	II	Standing on a corner site, this pair of flint-built cottages have a tiled overall roof and brickwork to their architraves and quoins. The windows are arched casements. Wooden doors are set in rusticated archways.	
Upperton Farmhouse		Upperton; 50.7717°N 0.2759°E	II	Now in commercial use and significantly remodelled in the mid-20th century, this was originally a farm building when erected in the 18th century. It has an arched doorway, a six-window range and grey and red brickwork, and the two storeys are separated by a string-course. The roof, with three dormers, sits behind a parapet.	
Wall and Gazebo at Westlords		Willingdon; 50.7917°N 0.2566°E	II	This flint wall was originally part of the Ratton Manor House estate. A house called Westlords, built in 1906 and not listed separately, now occupies the site. The 18th-century gazebo stands in one corner of the wall and has some stonework and a pyramid roof.	
Wall at Langney Priory		Langney; 50.7965°N 0.3143°E	II	This cobbled wall surrounds the garden of Langney Priory, another listed building.	
Wall at The Cottage		Meads; 50.7642°N 0.2743°E	II	This cobbled wall surrounds the garden of The Cottage, another listed building.	
War Memorial at Memorial Roundabout, South Street		Eastbourne; 50.7659°N 0.2829°E	II	This World War I memorial was sculpted by Henry Charles Fehr and was inaugurated in November 1920. A bronze Angel of Victory standing on a globe is mounted on a granite base. In addition to the plaque commemorating victims of World War I, there are later plaques representing subsequent conflicts.	
War Memorial at St Saviour's Church		Eastbourne; 50.7659°N 0.2829°E	II	Local architect Colin Hay Murray designed this World War I war memorial in 1920 to commemorate 57 Eastbourne men. The "well-executed" wooden Calvary cross has a "striking and ornate" brick and stone plinth.	
Warden's House at Eastbourne College		Meads; 50.7639°N 0.2806°E	II	This two-storey building is within the grounds of Eastbourne College and dates from the 19th century. The façade has a three-window range, each with a gable above. Other features include hood moulds above the ground-floor windows, a prominent chimney-stack and a tiled roof.	
Winter Garden		Eastbourne; 50.7634°N 0.2820°E	II	Henry Currey designed this building as a theatre in 1874–76. Additions, including a Baroque Floral Hall with cast iron arcades, were made in about 1910 by J.W. Woolnough. Most of the building is cast iron with some brick extensions and areas of glazing. The building was depicted in The Illustrated London News in 1882.	
27–30 Wish Hill		Willingdon; 50.7946°N 0.2551°E	II	This is a terrace of four houses built of knapped flint and with an overall hipped roof of tile. The arched casement windows and doors have brick architraves.	
Wish Hill Post Office		Willingdon; 50.7984°N 0.2515°E	II	The white paintwork on this early 19th-century building hides cobbled walls and brick quoins. The casement windows (two to each storey) are set below straight heads. The entrance is set in a cambered archway.	
Wish Tower		Eastbourne; 50.7612°N 0.2862°E	II	Built in 1806, this is contemporary with Eastbourne's other two Martello towers and the Redoubt Fort. It is a circular tower with cement-faced walls of 8-foot (2.4 m) thickness and an elevated entrance. It was reinforced during World War II with the addition of a projecting lookout post.	
