= Grade II* listed buildings in Eastbourne =

Eastbourne in the county of East Sussex

There are over 20,000 Grade II* listed buildings in England. This page is a list of these buildings in the district of Eastbourne in East Sussex.

== Eastbourne ==
Name	Location	Type	Completed (Note: The date given is the date used by Historic England as significant for the initial building or that of an important part in the structure's description.)	Date designated	Grid ref. (Note: Sometimes known as OSGB36, the grid reference is based on the British national grid reference system used by the Ordnance Survey.) Geo-coordinates	Entry number (Note: The "List Entry Number" is a unique number assigned to each listed building and scheduled monument by Historic England.)	Image
Statue of Royal Sussex Regiment Soldier at Grand Parade	Eastbourne	Statue	1906	17 May 1971	TV6173998929; 50°46′03″N 0°17′32″E	1043677	Statue of Royal Sussex Regiment Soldier at Grand Parade More images
Burlington (Clarence) Hotel	Eastbourne	Hotel	1855	27 May 1949	TV6169898883; 50°46′01″N 0°17′30″E	1190383	Burlington (Clarence) Hotel More images
All Souls Church	Eastbourne	Parish church	1882	17 May 1971	TV6144099238; 50°46′13″N 0°17′17″E	1353105	All Souls Church More images
Holy Trinity Church	Eastbourne	Parish church	1861	27 May 1949	TV6145598860; 50°46′01″N 0°17′17″E	1043652	Holy Trinity Church More images
St Saviour and St Peter's Church	Eastbourne	Parish church	1866	17 May 1971	TV6109298745; 50°45′57″N 0°16′59″E	1190569	St Saviour and St Peter's Church More images
Congress Theatre	Eastbourne	Theatre	1963	12 June 1998	TV6113198400; 50°45′46″N 0°17′00″E	1323698	Congress Theatre More images
Eastbourne Pier	Eastbourne	Pier	1888	17 May 1971	TV6185098847; 50°46′00″N 0°17′38″E	1353116	Eastbourne Pier More images
Walls and Gazebos at 1–11 Church Street	Willingdon	Wall		12 August 1981	TQ5890802358; 50°47′56″N 0°15′13″E	1353435	Upload Photo
Langney Priory	Langney	House	before 1121	27 May 1949	TQ6321002206; 50°47′47″N 0°18′52″E	1043639	Langney Priory More images
Main Block and Chapel of All Saints Hospital	Eastbourne	Hospital	1874	21 November 1978	TV6016797444; 50°45′16″N 0°16′09″E	1043617	Main Block and Chapel of All Saints Hospital More images
Old Parsonage	Old Town, Eastbourne	Parish hall	Early 16th century	27 May 1949	TV5985899489; 50°46′23″N 0°15′57″E	1190505	Old Parsonage More images
