= Central Methodist Church, Eastbourne =

Central Methodist Church
- Deliverance Centre Eastbourne
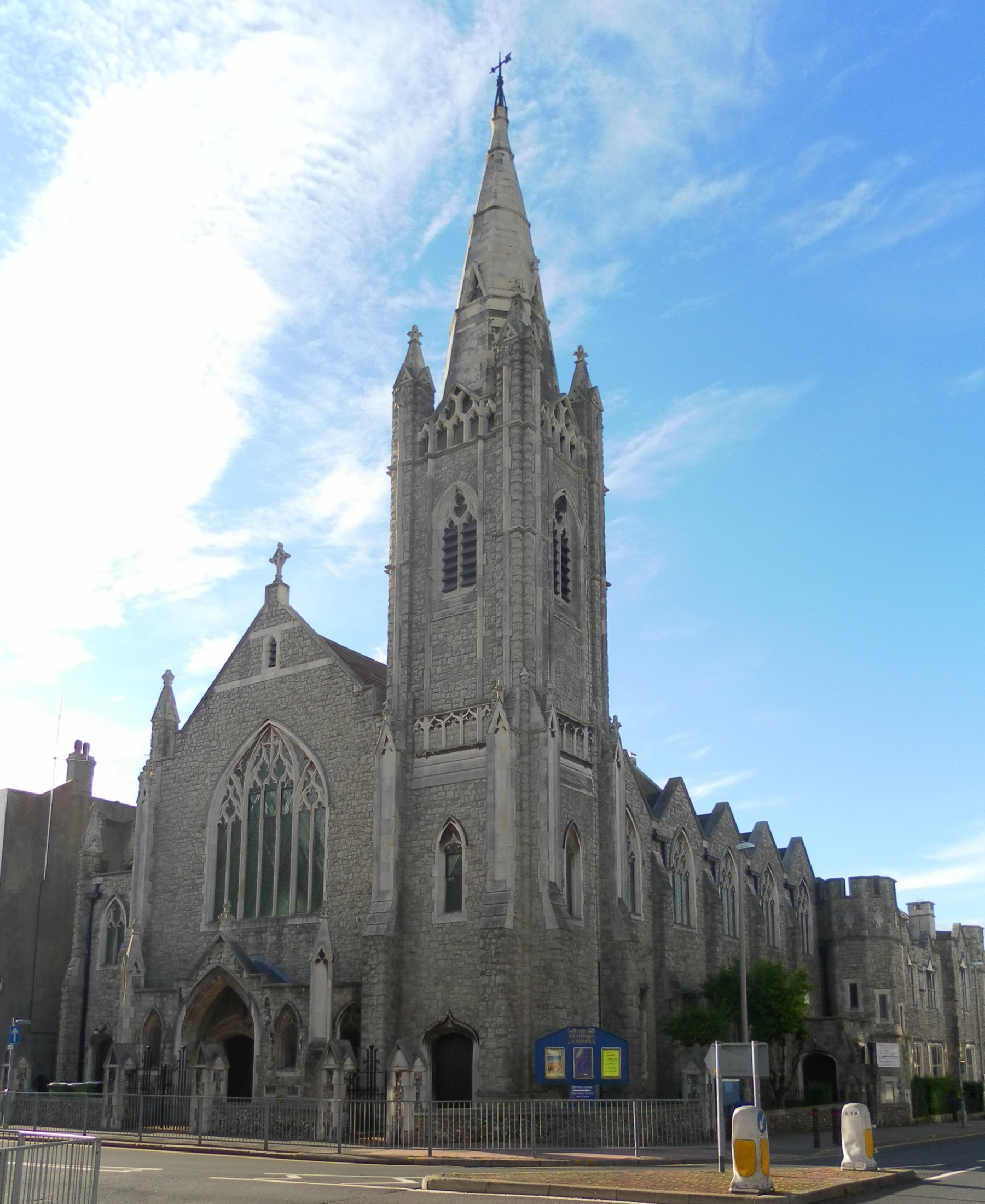
- The church from the east-southeast
- Central Methodist Church
- 50.7689°N 0.2888°E
- OS grid reference: TV 61483 99094
- Location: Pevensey Road, Eastbourne, East Sussex BN21 3HJ
- Country: England
- Denomination: Methodist

History
- Status: Church
- Events: 9 September 1908: registered for marriages 2018: closed as a Methodist church and reopened as a Pentecostal church January 2019: marriage registration as a Methodist church formally cancelled

Architecture
- Functional status: Active (as Pentecostal church)
- Heritage designation: Grade II
- Designated: 13 August 1996
- Architect: Carlos Crisford
- Style: Decorated Gothic Revival
- Groundbreaking: 1 April 1907 (Sunday school); 14 April 1908 (church)
- Completed: 16 September 1908
- Construction cost: £15,000 (£1,560,000 in 2025)

Specifications
- Capacity: 1,000

The former Central Methodist Church was until 2018 the main Methodist place of worship in Eastbourne, a town and borough in the English county of East Sussex. The large town-centre building, with attached schoolrooms and ancillary buildings, was the successor to earlier Methodist places of worship in the area. Soldiers brought the denomination to the area in 1803, when an isolated collection of clifftop villages stood where the 19th-century resort town of Eastbourne developed. A society they formed in that year to encourage Methodism's growth and outreach survives. Local Methodist worshipper and historian Carlos Crisford designed the lavish church in 1907, and it has been used for worship ever since—even as several other Methodist churches in the town and surrounding villages have declined and closed. For several years until 2013, it also housed a Baptist congregation displaced from their own church building. Central Methodist Church is a Grade II listed building.

A reorganisation of Methodist worship in the Eastbourne area and closer links with the United Reformed Church led to the formation of a Local ecumenical partnership in early 2018 between Central Methodist Church, Greenfield Methodist Church and two United Reformed congregations, which all came together under the name Emmanuel Church. Worship was consolidated at one of the buildings pending a rebuilding project to provide a new church and community building, and the other premises—including Central Methodist Church—were vacated. The church was then occupied by a Pentecostal group, which has renamed the premises Deliverance Centre Eastbourne and which continues to use the church as its main place of worship.

== History ==
=== Origins of Methodism in Eastbourne ===
Until the early 19th century, the area now covered by the town of Eastbourne was mostly farmland punctuated by four small and entirely independent villages linked by a single track. Bourne (later known as Old Town) stood inland from the English Channel coast and was based around the 12th-century parish church of St Mary the Virgin; Southbourne was a linear settlement on the road from Bourne to the sea; Sea Houses, further along this route, developed from the 14th century as a fishing village; and Meads stood on much higher land to the west, where the sheer cliffs around Beachy Head rose from the coastline. The combined population of the four settlements in 1801 was 1,668, and all were served by St Mary the Virgin Church in the parish of Bourne. Prince Edward visited Sea Houses in 1780, but unlike nearby Brighton this royal patronage failed to encourage tourism and residential growth—most likely because all the surrounding land was owned by two rich families (the Davies-Gilberts and the Dukes of Devonshire), who sought to control development.

Sea Houses grew in importance in the late 18th century nevertheless. A row of houses was built facing the sea in about 1790, and the area soon assumed strategic importance in the defence of the south coast against Napoleonic invaders. By the end of the 18th century, troops were sent to Hastings, Bexhill and Southbourne, and a chain of Martello towers was built. Soldiers from the 11th Hussars (known by that time as the 11th Regiment of Light Dragoons) reached Eastbourne in July 1803, and a newspaper report of 5 October 1803 noted that "everything here is on the alert to receive the enemy: the whole of the 11th Light Dragoons have been ordered from their different outposts, and are stationed at Hastings, Bexhill and Southbourne [... and] the Sussex and Gloucester Militias [... made] entrenchments at Sea Houses".

These soldiers were almost certainly the founders of Methodist worship in the Eastbourne area. Local Methodist historian Carlos Crisford, who later designed Central Methodist Church, first made this claim, and subsequent research has found that there was no Methodist presence before 1803. The first Nonconformist chapel in the Eastbourne area was the "Marsh Chapel", registered in the late 18th century to a group described simply as Calvinists: at the time this could refer either to Calvinistic Baptists or to Methodists following Calvinist theology, such as those who were aligned to the Countess of Huntingdon's Connexion. The Marsh Chapel's later history proves that it had no Methodist connection, though: after a period of tension between different factions in the congregation, the church split into two: Independents stayed in the building, and Strict Baptists moved elsewhere and founded a new church. The Marsh Chapel was therefore of Calvinistic Baptist character.

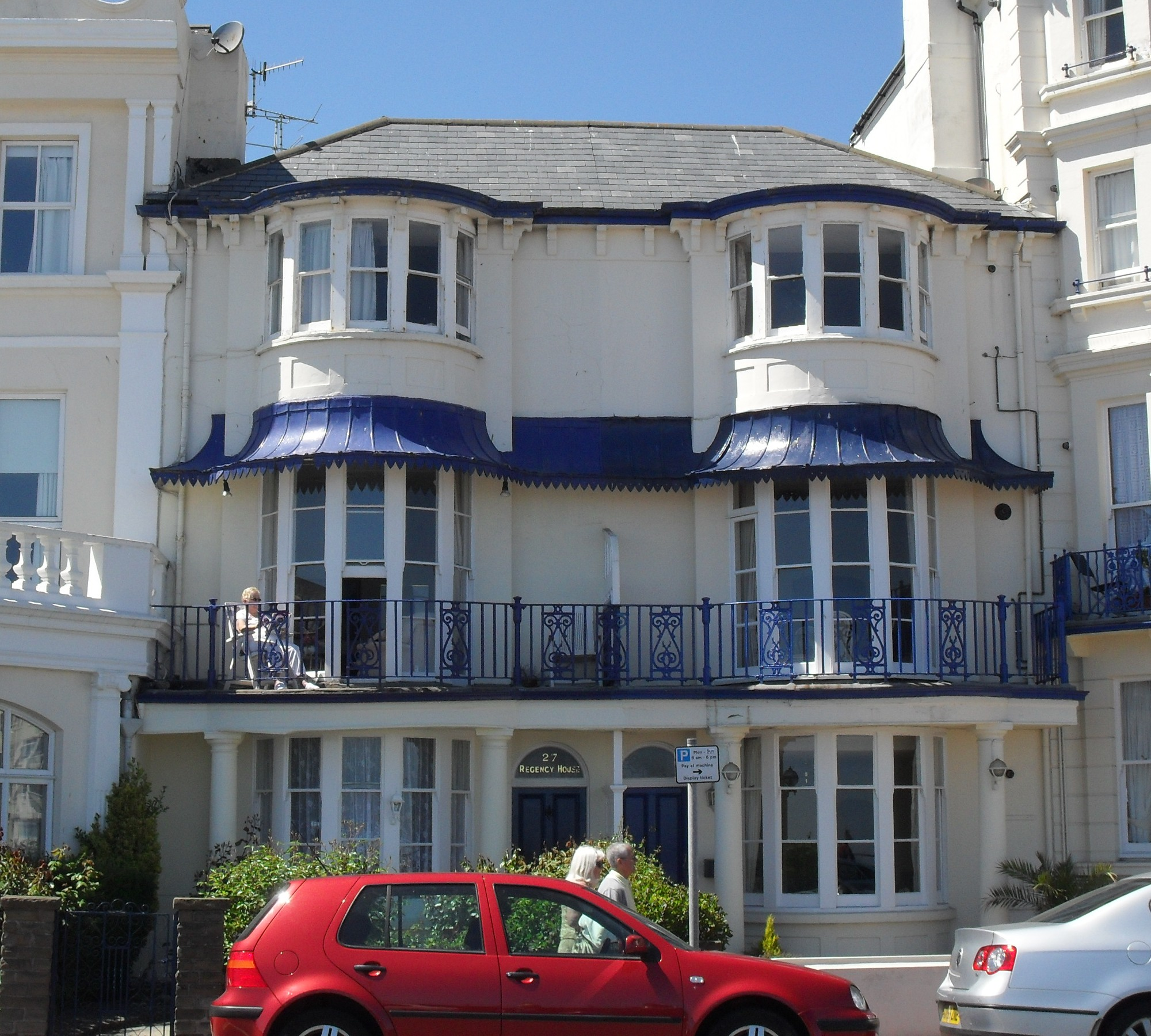
27 and 28 Marine Parade now occupy the site of Eastbourne's first Methodist place of worship, which pre-dated Central Methodist Church by 104 years.

A group of these soldiers registered themselves as Dissenters, as was required by the laws of the time; this allowed them to establish a place of worship in one of the houses built in 1790 at Sea Houses, where they were stationed. In 1803, they founded the "Society of the People Called Methodists" to encourage the spread of their beliefs in the Eastbourne area. The house does not survive: the mid 19th-century buildings at 27 and 28 Marine Parade are on the site.

Many of the troops were posted away from Sea Houses in 1804. Their services had interested the local civilian population, though, and with the help of shopowner Henry Beck the Society and community continued to thrive after the soldiers' withdrawal. Beck moved from nearby Lewes in 1804 and set up a shop in Sea Houses; he joined the Society and became an important member of the Methodist community: by 1813 he was one of the first recorded Methodist preachers in Sussex. In 1808, Rev. Robert Pilter, known as the "Apostle of Kent" for his Methodist missionary work in that county, became associated with the Eastbourne cause, and further helped its development.

Pilter used his experience of establishing a Methodist chapel at Brighton to help the community acquire their first permanent place of worship. He was called to minister elsewhere in Sussex before he could buy a plot of land, but his successor was able to do so almost immediately: in September 1809 Rev. Robert Wheeler paid £145 (equivalent to £10,000 in 2025) for the site in the Southbourne area, where the present Grove Road runs. The Anglican Diocese of Chichester recorded the chapel's existence in its Records of Dissenting Chapels published on 9 March 1810, and it officially opened 19 days later. The cost of construction was £861 (equivalent to £58,000 in 2025). In the chapel's early years, locals and the remaining soldiers were joined by increasing numbers of wealthy visitors who were attracted to the growing town of Eastbourne by its new reputation as a high-class resort; £8.10s.- (£577 in 2025) had to be spent on extensions soon after it opened.

Difficulties soon arose though: in 1815, the Napoleonic Wars ended and all soldiers posted to Eastbourne left, depriving the chapel of some of its followers. In 1817, Henry Beck moved to Hastings to evangelise that town, which had no Methodist place of worship. Debt was also a problem: the interest rate on the borrowings for the chapel's construction was 5%. The chapel's transfer from the Brighton Methodist Circuit to the much larger Lewes Circuit in 1825 caused disruption, storm damage in the 1840s meant services had to be held in the open air for a time, and the congregation reached a low point in 1860.

=== Pevensey Road Chapel ===
Nevertheless, most debt had been paid off by then, and members of the chapel decided to build a new church nearer the newly developed centre of the town. By 1860, the seafront area east of Sea Houses, with its new promenade, was the new focal point of Eastbourne, where increasing numbers of visitors and newly arrived residents congregated.

The cause was helped by lay preacher Thomas Scott's efforts to secure a permanent resident preacher for Eastbourne's Methodist population. This was achieved in 1860, at which time the Lewes Methodist Circuit was renamed "Lewes and Eastbourne" to reflect the latter town's growing importance. Scott also contributed £25 (£3,000 in 2025) to the building fund for the proposed new church, and was instrumental in encouraging the idea.

Pevensey Road had just been laid out across the fields of a farm whose land was owned by the Duke of Devonshire and leased to tenant farmers. Eastbourne's Methodists acquired an 80-by-80-foot (24 m × 24 m) plot in 1863, and building work started almost immediately: Sir Francis Lycett, an important figure in 19th-century Methodism, placed the foundation stone on 11 November 1863. Architect R.K. Blessley designed the Decorated Gothic Revival flint and stone building. Amid scenes of celebration, Pevensey Road Chapel was opened in July 1864; it cost £1,874.16s.7d (£206,000 in 2025), and the freehold of the site was acquired later for £150. The old chapel at Grove Road was sold to a Strict Baptist congregation, who used it from May 1865 until 1880 when they opened the present Grove Road Strict Baptist Chapel nearby.

Congregations grew slowly—not helped by a scarlet fever epidemic which killed many people in 1864 and frightened many visitors away from the town—but the Methodist community was fully established in the town by this time and began to expand its reach. A new Sunday school was opened behind the chapel in 1869, and in the surrounding villages and the new suburbs of Eastbourne, several Methodist chapels were founded or became associated with the Eastbourne cause. This was helped by the creation in 1871 of a separate Eastbourne Circuit—a much smaller administrative area than its Lewes and Eastbourne predecessor.

=== The new Central Church ===
By 1896, the chapel had more than 250 regular members, and in summer there was not enough room to accommodate all the visitors who wanted to worship. By the end of the century, trustees of the chapel began to consider extending the building to add at least 200 more seats; and by 1902, a grander plan was announced to replace the chapel with a 1,000-capacity "central church", to act as the centre for Eastbourne Methodists' scheme of "aggressive evangelism" among tourists, the ever-growing permanent population and other chapels in the Eastbourne Circuit. Members of the church formed a committee in late 1902 to consider how best to proceed and to establish and look after a fund to pay for whatever work was decided on.

Pevensey Road Chapel was declared structurally unsound in 1904, and more than £3,000 was available in the building fund. Another committee was formed in that year to oversee the demolition of the chapel and its replacement with a much larger church and schoolroom. Permission to knock the chapel down was granted in 1906, and on 1 April 1907 work began on the new buildings with the laying of the Sunday school foundation stone. Labour politician Arthur Henderson mp, himself a Methodist, addressed a public meeting at Eastbourne Town Hall to commemorate the stone-laying, and people were encouraged to contribute to the building fund by laying a shilling on the stones. Services were not disrupted during the building works: after the old chapel was demolished, churchgoers worshipped in the former Sunday school hall.

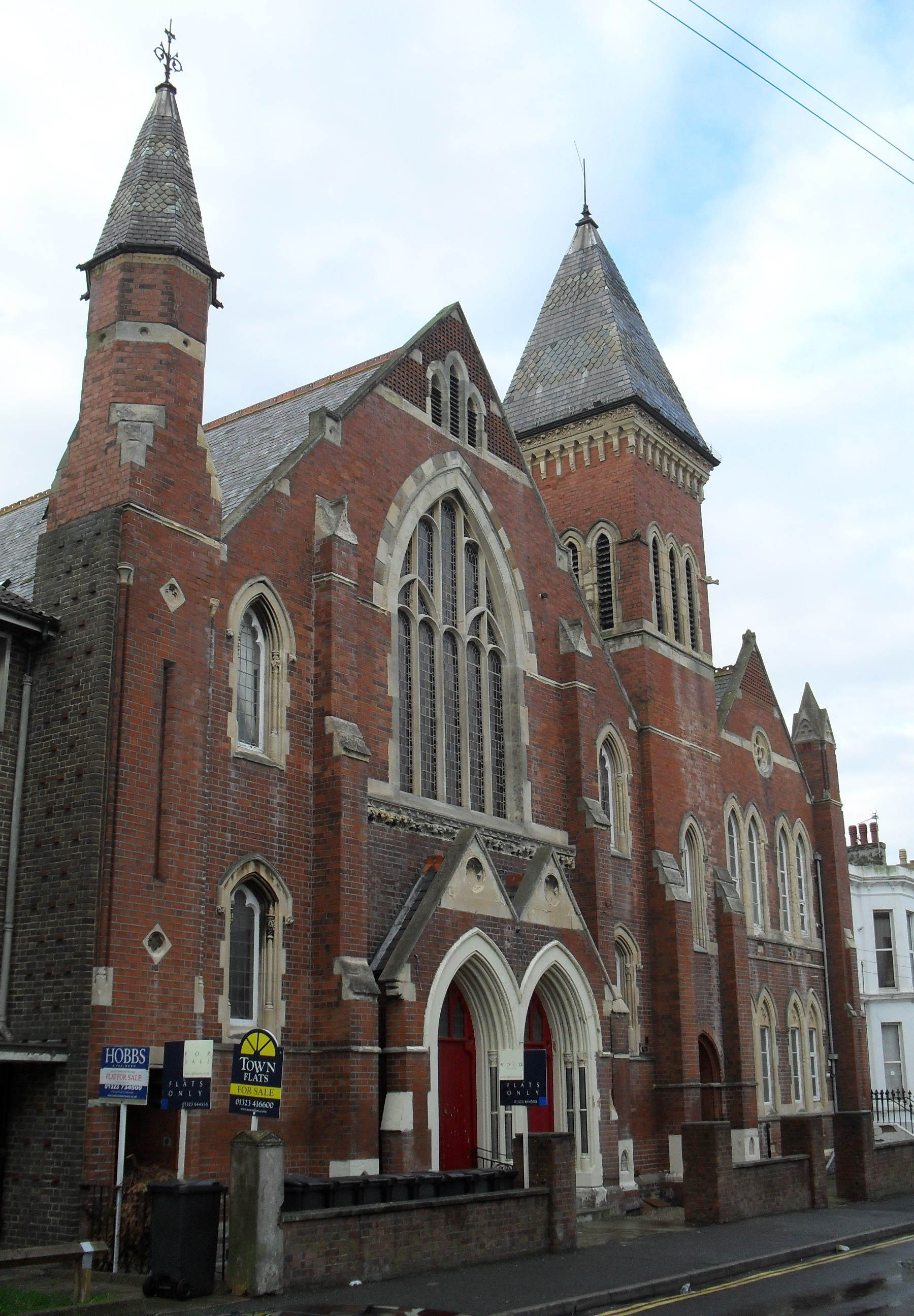
The congregation of the former Ceylon Place Baptist Church worshipped at Central Methodist Church for several years after the conversion of their building into flats.

By early 1908, the new Sunday school was finished, and work began on the church itself: the foundation stone was laid on 14 April 1908. Construction took five months and cost about £15,000 (£1,560,000 in 2025), leaving a debt of £11,600: some of the building fund had been used to establish new Methodist churches in outlying parts of Eastbourne. Rev. John Scott Lidgett ch, the President of the Wesleyan Conference at the time, opened the new Central Methodist Church on 16 September 1908. Carlos Crisford himself designed it, and the Eastbourne building firm Miller and Selmes constructed the church. The building had a tall corner tower topped with a spire; to celebrate the opening, a group of worshippers of all ages were hauled in a box to the top of the spire, where they ate breakfast.

Membership of Central Methodist Church grew from about 200 when it opened to 254 in 1917, and money continued to be raised slowly to pay the debt. The final payments were made in 1925; sources of the money included a wide variety of fundraising activities and the assistance of J. Arthur Rank, the Methodist industrialist. Other changes in the interwar period included the formation of several clubs and societies, funds to help people during the Great Depression, and the installation of a war memorial to commemorate 18 church members who died during World War I. In 1934, a Methodist guest house was opened nearby; the Central Church held a dedication service for the new building, and many guests would worship at the church during their stay.

Central Methodist Church was involved in World War II in several ways. Its large space and central position made it a natural "reception centre", and thousands of evacuees from London passed through on their way to their temporary host families. By 1940, Eastbourne was considered to be at high risk of attack, so thousands of residents and former evacuees were sent to the church before being evacuated out of the town. The church was classed as Eastbourne's "controlled zone", and about 35,000 people passed through in a few days in September 1940.

Many churches in Eastbourne were damaged (or in some cases destroyed) by bombs from late 1940 onwards, but Central Methodist Church survived unscathed—although on one occasion an unexploded bomb landed nearby, threatening its destruction—and although the building was temporarily closed (because its central location made it vulnerable), services continued in the crypt, which also served as a makeshift shelter. The Sunday school closed for a time as well.

Membership of the church continued to rise after the war, as Eastbourne recovered and began to grow again. The highest recorded figure (excluding summer visitors, who always boosted attendances significantly) was 486 in 1967, by which time youth clubs, women's groups and a choir had been established. Meanwhile, the Society of the People Called Methodists, founded in 1803 at Sea Houses, continued its unbroken history by meeting regularly at the church.

Central Methodist Church was designated a Grade II Listed building on 13 August 1996. It was licensed for worship in accordance with the Places of Worship Registration Act 1855 and was given the registration number 43233, and was registered for the solemnisation of marriages on 9 September 1908 in accordance with the Marriage Act 1836.

=== Later history and closure ===
For several years until 2013, a Baptist congregation shared the church premises. Ceylon Place Baptist Church, a brick and Bath stone Early English Gothic Revival building, was built on the road of that name in 1885 to replace a tin tabernacle erected in 1871. It closed in the early 21st century and was converted for residential use. The congregation moved to Central Methodist Church temporarily while they sought a new place of worship. The community, now known as New Hope Baptist Church, relocated to a building in Longstone Road before buying a former social club on Beach Road and converting it into a church.

In 2015, the Methodist and United Reformed Churches announced plans for a merger between four of their congregations in central Eastbourne and the consolidation of worship on the site of Upperton United Reformed Church, which would be demolished and replaced with a new building named Emmanuel Church. The other three churches, including Central Methodist Church, would close. As an interim step, Greenfield Methodist Church's name was changed to Emmanuel Church and it now holds services for both denominations. Central Methodist Church's Methodist congregation vacated the building in 2018, and it is now occupied exclusively by the Church of God Worldwide Mission. This Pentecostal group had met locally since 1998 but had no building of their own; they had shared Central Methodist Church since 2009 or earlier. Regular services and prayer meetings are held. The church is now known as Deliverance Centre Eastbourne. Central Methodist Church's registrations for worship and marriages were cancelled in January 2019.

== Architecture ==
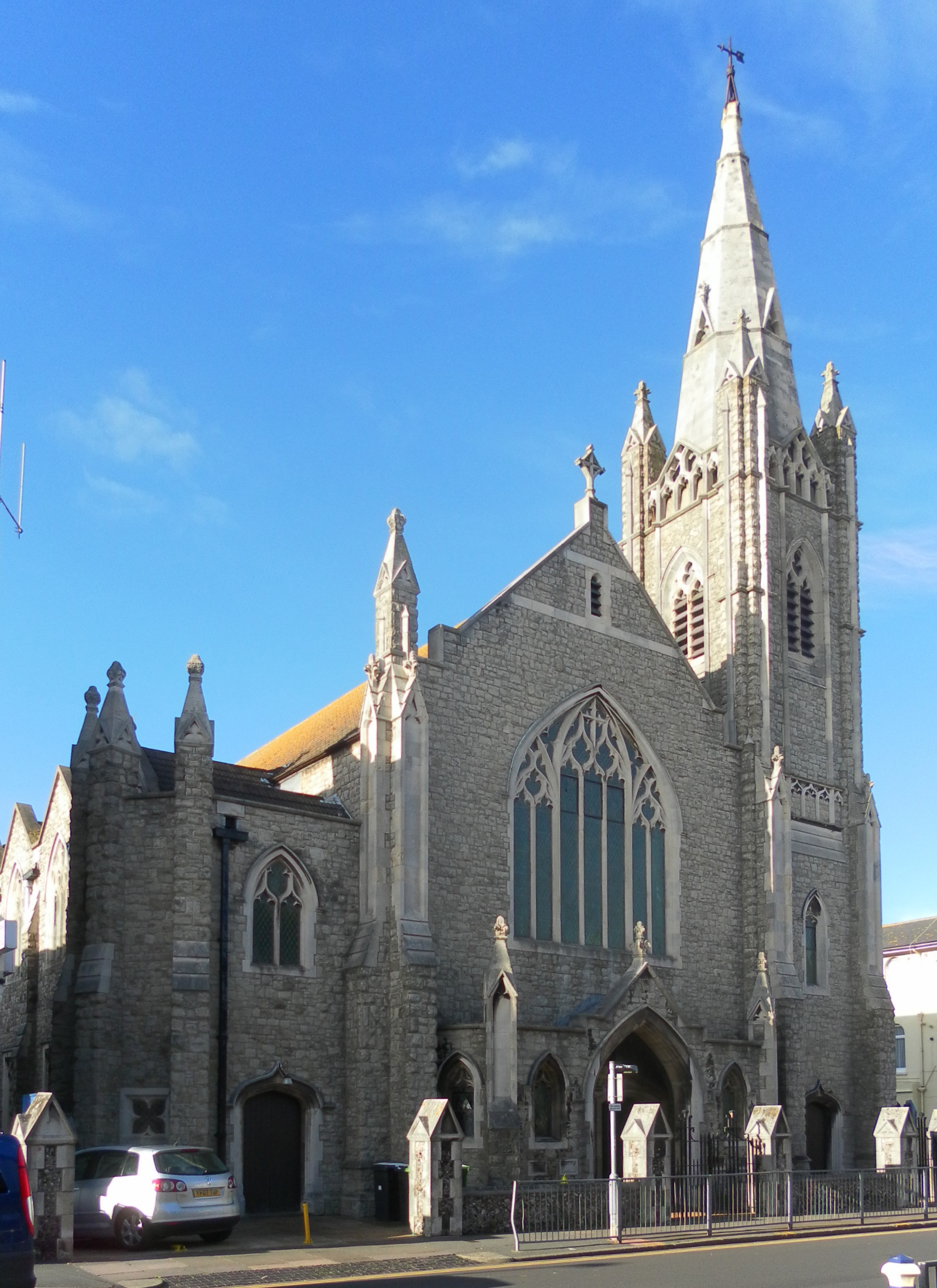
The Pevensey Road façade has a seven-light lancet window and pinnacled buttresses.

Central Methodist Church is an elaborate Decorated Gothic Revival building of grey stone rubble laid in courses with some ashlar. The roof is laid with pantiles, which are not original. Nikolaus Pevsner wrote that its appearance was "entirely churchy"—resembling an Anglican place of worship much more than typical Nonconformist chapels of the era (of which Eastbourne has several examples).

The church and its associated buildings stand on a corner site. The church itself is entered from Pevensey Road and faces southeastwards; its side façade faces southwest on Susans Road. Next to it on this road is the Sunday school and church hall, which also has a northwest elevation along Langney Road. The church entrance is in a canted buttressed porch next to the tower, which stands at the southeast corner. There are two pairs of lancet windows in the porch, each with trefoils above. A wide seven-light lancet window with tracery and trefoils is above this. The double doorway in the porch has a carving of a verse from Psalm 100: enter into his gates with thanksgiving and into his courts with praise. The Susans Road façade is of five bays, each with a gable and arched windows at the upper (gallery) level. There is another porch at the northeast corner.

The tower has three levels, with crocketed buttresses to the lower and middle stages. The upper level has a belfry with louvres and trefoil-headed windows. Above this, the spire is of stone and has lucarnes (small dormers popular in Gothic architecture) and a weather-vane.

The original interior survives. A wooden gallery, supported on slender iron columns, runs round below the hammerbeam roof. Other fittings dating from the church's opening include pews, a pulpit and an organ case originally fitted with a three-manual pipe organ.

The church hall is a two-storey Decorated Gothic building of stone, with gables, cast ironwork and lancet windows with tracery. The adjacent Sunday school, also of two storeys, has a Jacobean appearance, with battlemented turrets in several places. There is a two-window range on the Langney Road side; each has prominent transoms, mullions and pediments. The Susans Road façade has a four-window range, mostly with leadlights. Inside, a staircase with ornate cast ironwork survives.

== Associated churches ==
Central Methodist Church was the principal church in the Eastbourne Methodist Circuit, which has existed in its present form since 1871. It was linked to or associated with several other Methodist churches in the town and in surrounding villages.

Greenfield Methodist Church, an Early English-style red-brick building, has served Eastbourne's Old Town area since 1898, although worshippers had met for ten years prior to that above a shop. Central Methodist Church's predecessor, the Pevensey Road Chapel, helped to found and pay for the new church, whose registration number under the Places of Worship Registration Act 1855 is 36771.

In Eastbourne's poor East End, chapels were founded at Beamsley Road in 1886 and Ringwood Road in 1904. Another church, St Aidan's, was opened nearby in 1913, and the congregations merged and worshipped in that building after the Methodist Union of 1932 brought together the denomination's different subgroups. St Aidan's Church survived until 2001, but was closed and demolished in that year.

The postwar housing estate of Hampden Park gained its first church in 1960, after Central Church played a leading role in establishing a community of worshippers there. St Stephen's Church (now the Broadway United Church, registration number 67820) was opened on 23 July 1960 and was extended 11 years later. A few years later, Central Church was represented on the cross-denominational "Langney Church Sponsoring Committee", which sought to open a new united church in the greatly expanded suburb of Langney. With support from all the major denominations, St Barnabas United Church (number 74389) opened in 1976.

Willingdon, an outlying village, was added to the Circuit in 1894 when a red-brick church was built for just over £400. Popular open-air services had been held in the area for some time beforehand. Trinity Church (number 58092) is now shared with United Reformed and Baptist worshippers.

Churches in the nearby towns and villages of Hailsham (registration number 25266), Cross-in-Hand (35068) and Gamelands (near Horam; 38481) are also part of the Circuit. The minister of Central Methodist Church was also responsible for Blacknest (or Blackness) Chapel, a small brick chapel opened in 1891 in the parish of Westham, which was closed and demolished early in the 21st century.

Associated churches

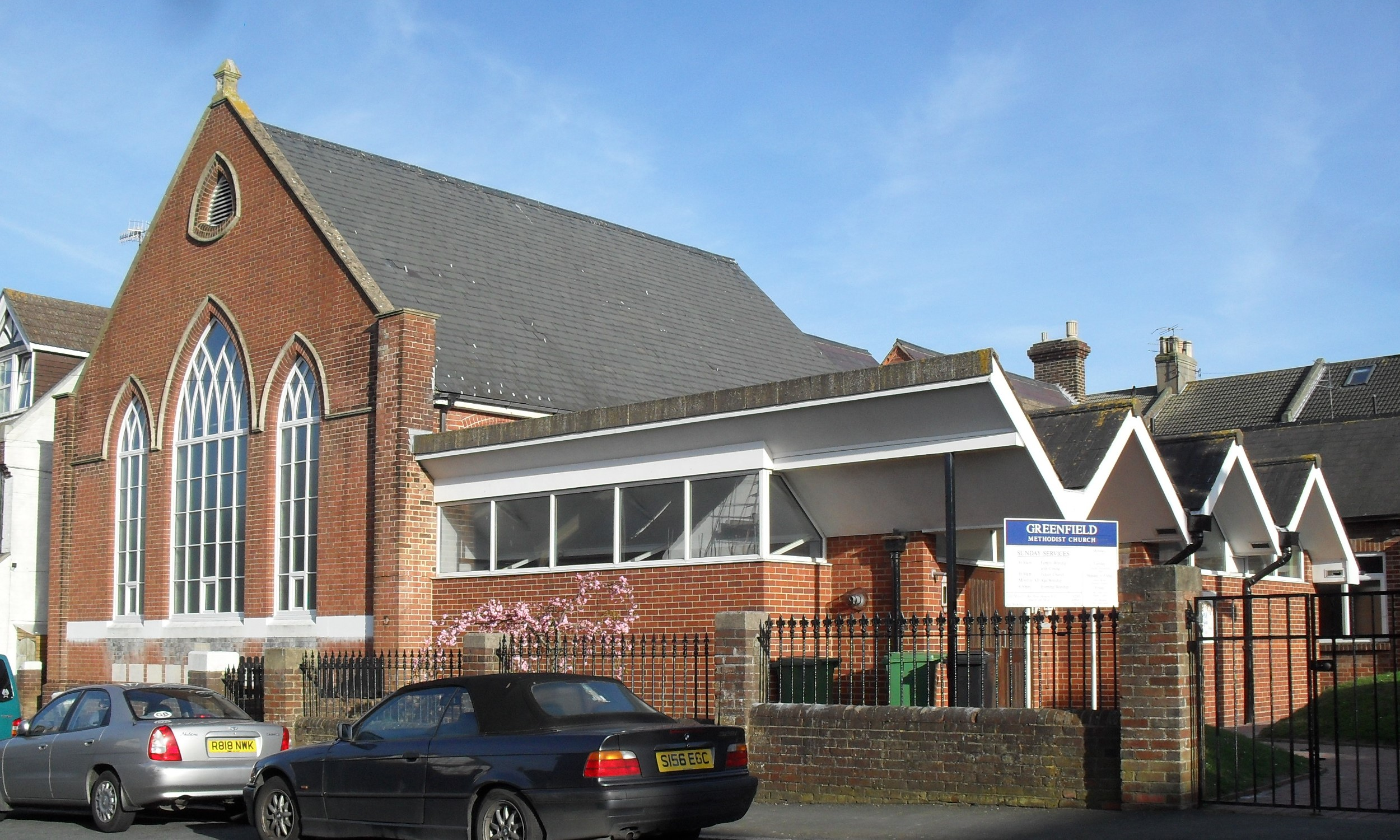
Greenfield Methodist Church

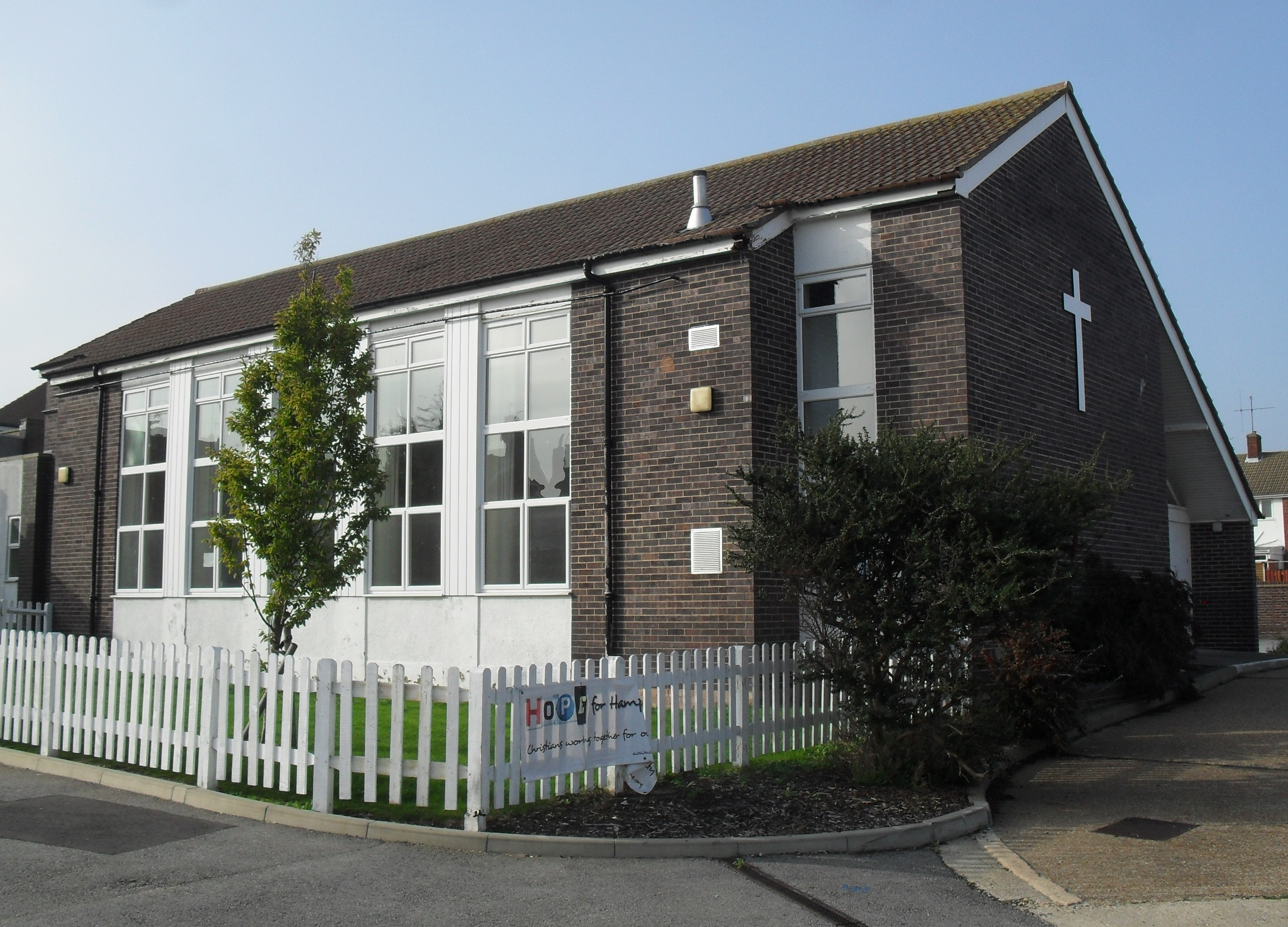
Broadway United Church

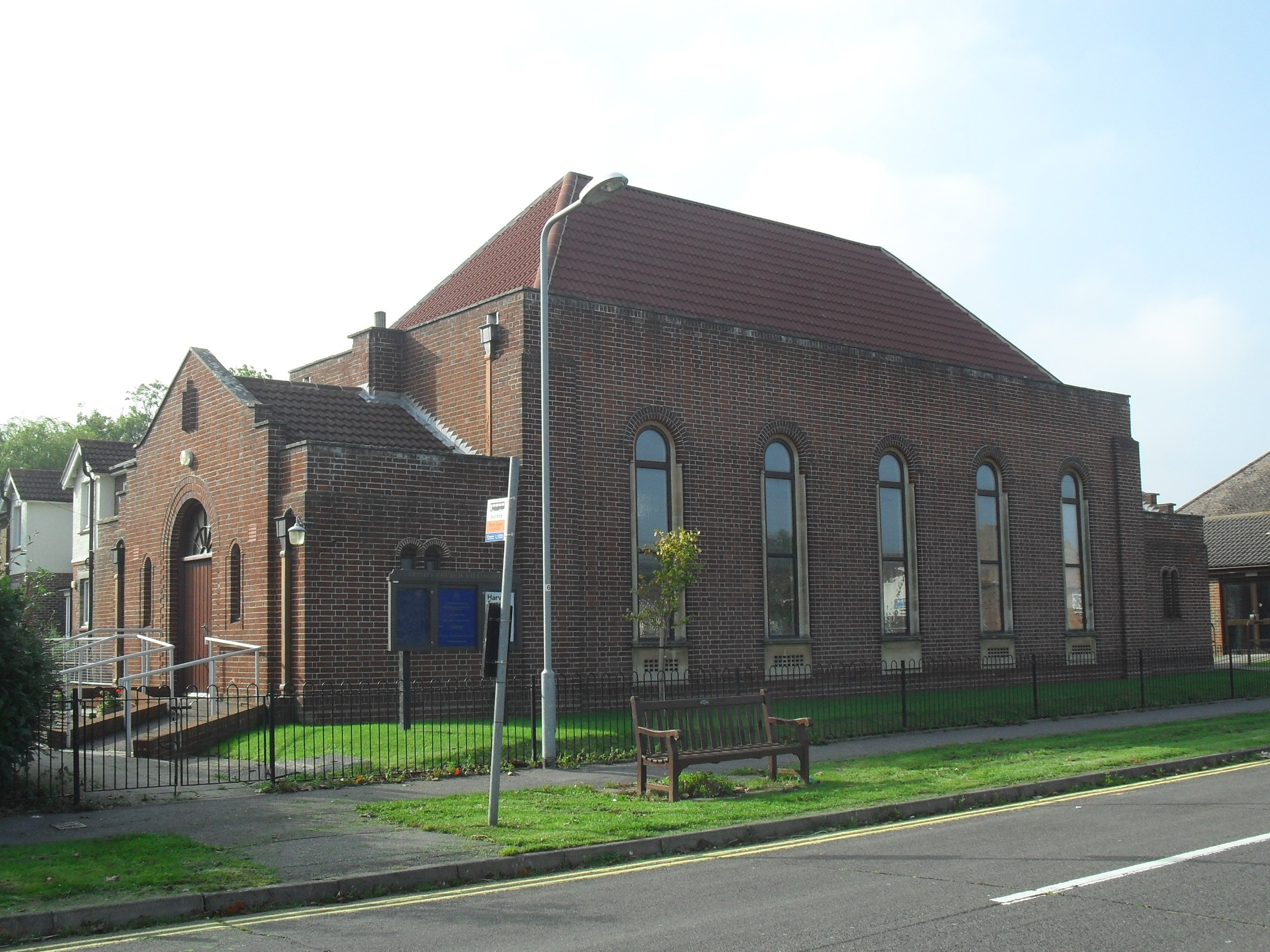
Trinity Church

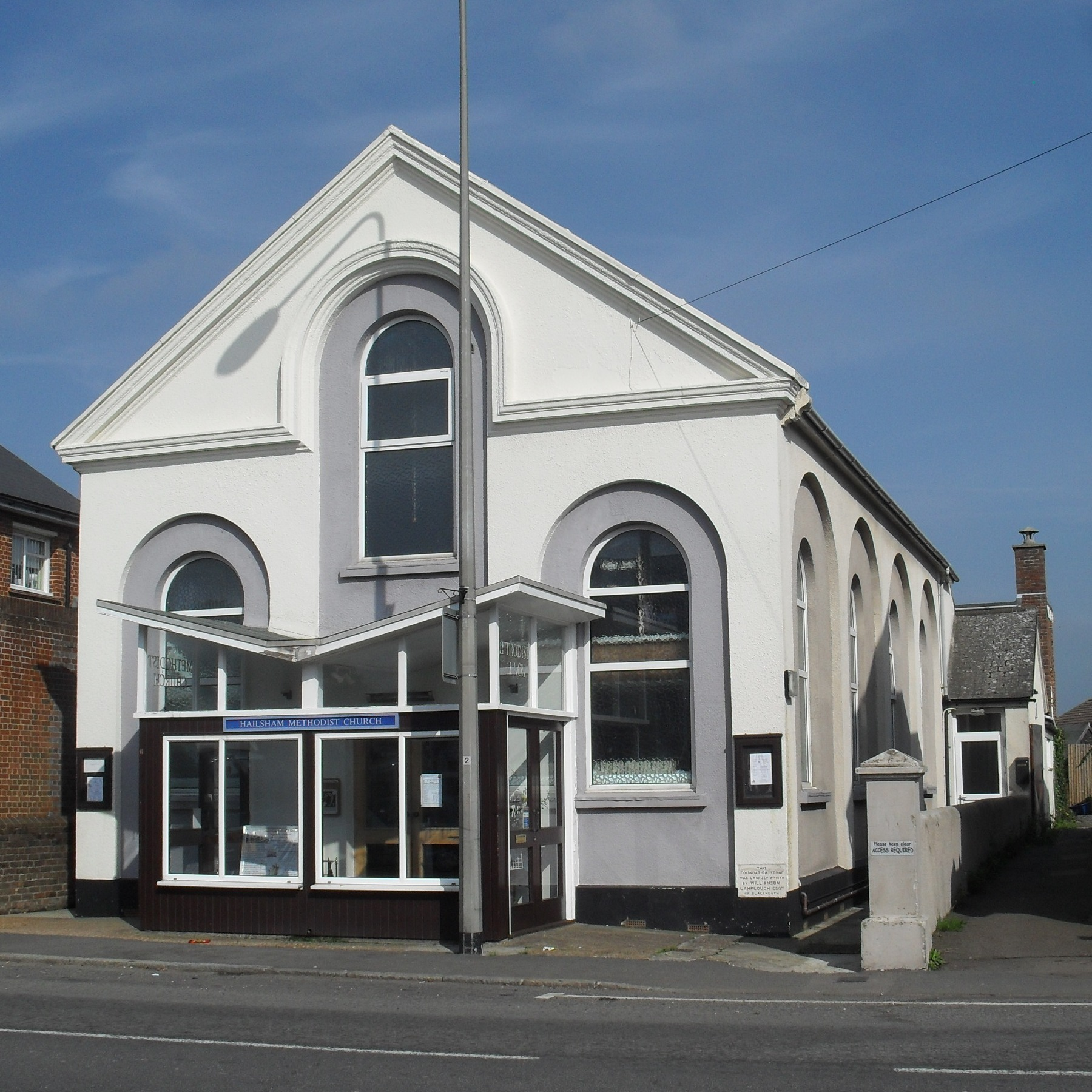
Hailsham Methodist Church

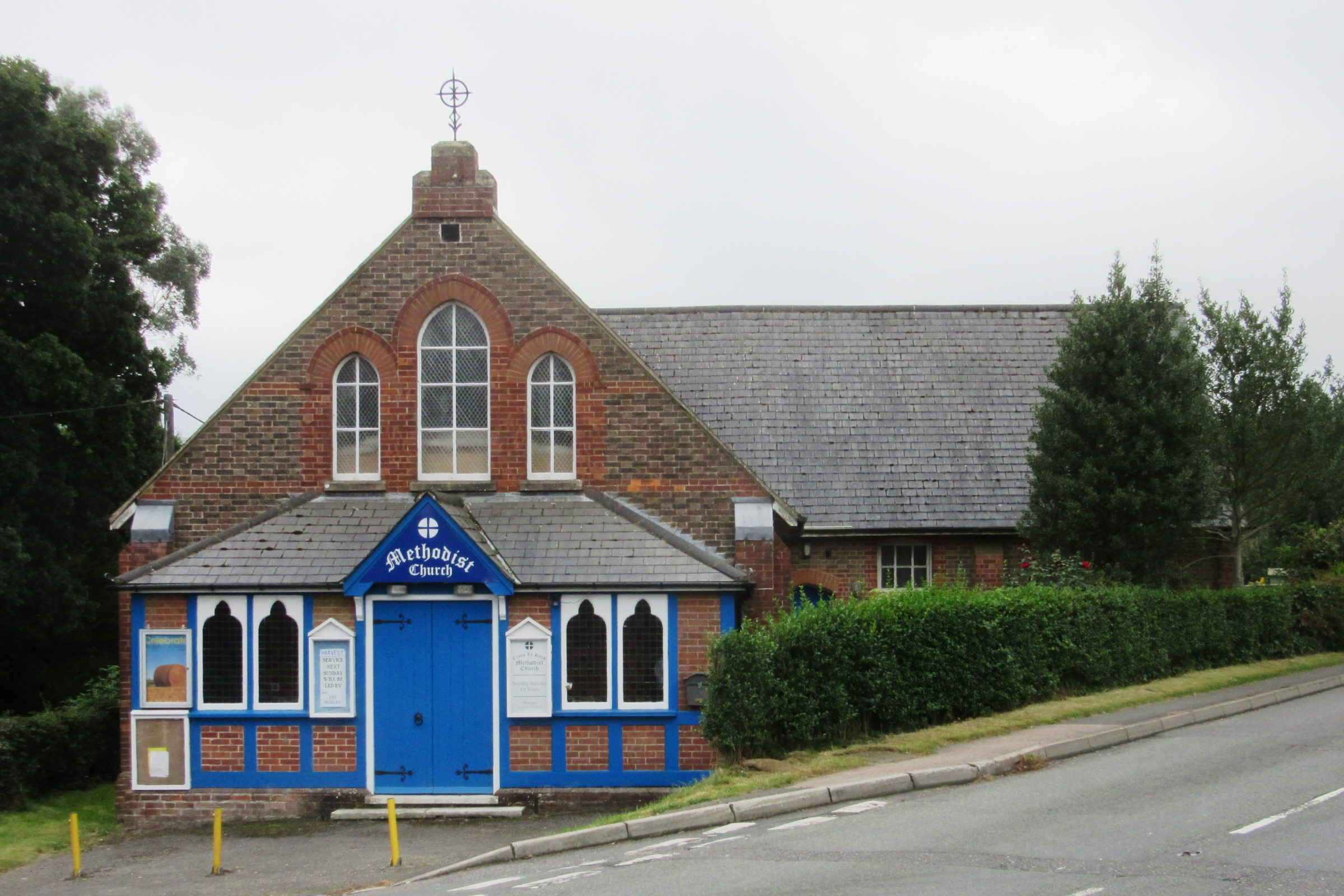
Cross-in-Hand Methodist Church

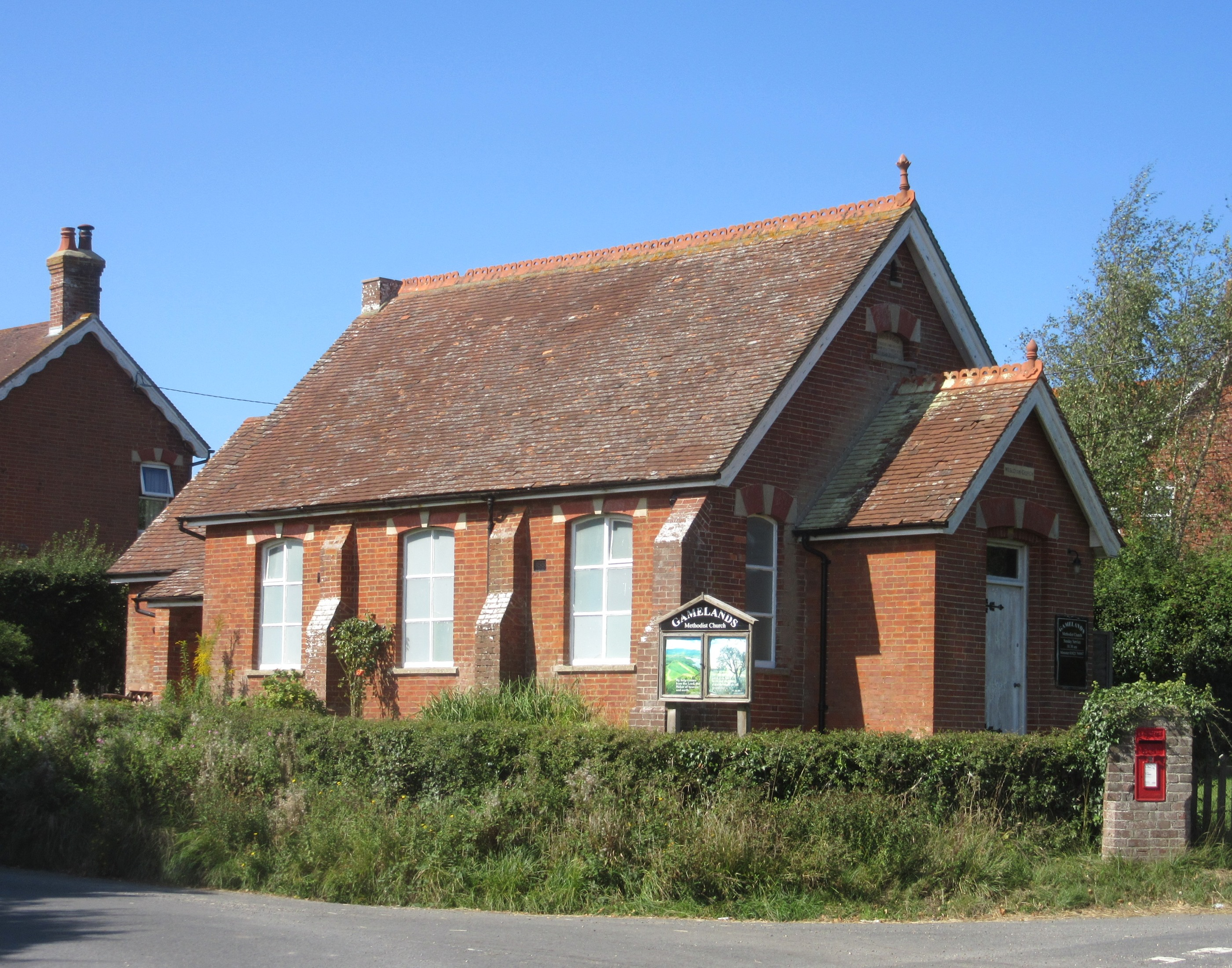
Gamelands Methodist Church

== See also ==
- List of places of worship in Eastbourne
- Listed buildings in Eastbourne
- Media related to Central Methodist Church, Eastbourne at Wikimedia Commons

== Bibliography ==
- Berry, Patricia; Gordon, Kevin (1996). Britain in Old Photographs: Around Eastbourne. Stroud: Sutton Publishing. ISBN 0-7509-1272-3.
- Chambers, Ralph F. (1954). The Strict Baptist Chapels of England: Sussex. Vol. 2. Thornton Heath: Ralph F. Chambers.
- Dunn Wilson, David (1978). From Seahouses to Central: A Short Account of "The People Called Methodists" in Eastbourne (Lecture). Eastbourne: D. Dunn Wilson.
- Elleray, D. Robert (1978). Eastbourne: A Pictorial History. Chichester: Phillimore & Co. ISBN 0-85033-964-2.
- Elleray, D. Robert (2004). Sussex Places of Worship. Worthing: Optimus Books. ISBN 0-9533132-7-1.
- Nairn, Ian; Pevsner, Nikolaus (1965). The Buildings of England: Sussex. Harmondsworth: Penguin Books. ISBN 0-14-071028-0.
- Surtees, John (2002). Eastbourne: A History. Chichester: Phillimore & Co. ISBN 1-86077-226-9.
- Various authors (1978). 175 Years of Methodism in Eastbourne 1803–1978. Eastbourne: Eastbourne Methodist Circuit.
