= Eastbourne Blue Plaques =

Heritage scheme in Eastbourne, England

Eastbourne Blue Plaques is a scheme for erecting blue plaques in Eastbourne, England. It was implemented in 1993 following a suggestion to Eastbourne Borough Council by Eastbourne Civic Society (now Eastbourne Society). The joint project involves the mounting of commemorative plaques on buildings associated with famous people. The principles for selection are broadly those already established by English Heritage for such plaques in London. The first was erected in November 1994 in Milnthorpe Road at the former home of Sir Ernest Shackleton, the Antarctic explorer.

== Plaques and personalities commemorated ==
Name	Dates	Profession	Plaque location	Sponsoring body
Mabel Lucie Attwell	1879–1964	Artist	Ocklynge Manor, 11 Mill Road	Eastbourne Borough Council and Eastbourne Civic Society
Lewis Carroll	1832–1898	Writer	7 Lushington Road	ditto
Cyril Connolly	1903–1974	Journalist, critic and author	48 St John's Road	Eastbourne Society
Jeffery Farnol	1878–1952	Writer	14 Denton Road	Eastbourne Society
Eric Ravilious	1903–1942	Artist	11 Glynde Avenue	Eastbourne Borough Council and Eastbourne Civic Society
Sir Ernest Shackleton	1874–1922	Antarctic Explorer	14 Milnthorpe Road	ditto

The artist and illustrator Mabel Lucie Attwell is listed under her married name of Mrs H Earnshaw at Ocklynge Manor in Kelly's Directories of Eastbourne for 1935 and 1936. Lewis Carroll, the author of Alice in Wonderland, spent the first of 19 summer holidays in Eastbourne in 1877, initially in Lushington Road. Cyril Connolly’s plaque in St John’s Road commemorates the residence of this man of letters during the last nine years of his life. The author Jeffery Farnol died at his home in Denton Road in 1952. Eric Ravilious was the town’s most famous painter, book illustrator and engraver. While serving as a war artist, he failed to return from an air-sea rescue mission off Iceland in 1942. The plaque in Glynde Avenue is at his childhood home. Sir Ernest Shackleton’s blue plaque in Milnthorpe Road was the first to be erected in the town. The polar explorer lived there from 1916 to 1922.

Name	Dates	Profession	Plaque location	Sponsoring body
Pupils of St Cyprian's School
Sir Cecil Beaton	1904–1980	Photographer and designer	65 Summerdown Road	Eastbourne Borough Council and Eastbourne Civic Society
Cyril Connolly	1903–1974	Writer and Journalist	65 Summerdown Road	ditto
Henry C Longhurst	1909–1978	Journalist and MP	65 Summerdown Road	ditto
Gavin Maxwell	1914–1969	Naturalist	65 Summerdown Road	ditto
George Orwell (Eric Blair)	1903–1950	Writer	65 Summerdown Road	ditto

St Cyprian's School (1899–1939) in Summerdown Road was the preparatory school attended by a number of pupils who enjoyed success in later life in addition to those listed.

== Other plaques ==
In addition to the plaques which form part of the above scheme, the following plaques and memorials have been erected by other bodies or individuals.

Name	Dates	Profession/Dedication	Plaque and location	Sponsoring body
Nelson Victor Carter	1887–1916	Company Sergeant Major - holder of the Victoria Cross	Blue plaque at 33 Greys Road	Royal Sussex Regimental Association
Charlie Chester	1914–1997	Comedian, poet and artist	Wooden plaque inside Royal Hippodrome	Friends of the Royal Hippodrome with support of Eastbourne Civic Society
Tommy Cooper	1921–1984	Comedian and magician	Iron silhouette at 7 Motcombe Lane	Family member
Charles Dickens	1812–1870	Writer	Blue plaque at Pilgrims, 4–6 Borough Lane	Eastbourne Dickensians
Professor Thomas Huxley	1825–1895	Biologist	Small white plaque at Hodeslea, 10 Staveley Road	Unknown (probably a previous owner of the house)
St Mary's: one-time barracks, workhouse and hospital	1794–1990	Dedicated to former soldiers, inmates, patients and staff	Blue plaque at Letheren Place	Former staff of St Mary's Hospital
Professor Frederick Soddy	1877–1956	Physicist and radiochemist	Blue plaque at Eastbourne College, Blackwater Road	Institute of Physics
Professor Frederick Soddy	1877–1956	Physicist and radiochemist	Small bronze plaque at 6 Bolton Road	Unknown (probably a previous owner of the house)

Nelson Victor Carter, born in Eastbourne in 1887, was posthumously awarded the Victoria Cross while serving with the Royal Sussex Regiment on the Western Front in 1916. His medal is on display at the Eastbourne Redoubt. An appeal launched by the local branch of the Royal Sussex Regimental Association resulted in the erection of a plaque at the house in Greys Road where he and his wife had lived. The radio star Charlie Chester was born Cecil Victor Manser, the son of a local cinema sign-painter who is listed in the 1914 Eastbourne Blue Book at 5 Tideswell Road. An iron silhouette of Tommy Cooper, complete with the comedian's characteristic fez and wand, can be seen at what was his weekend cottage in Motcombe Lane.

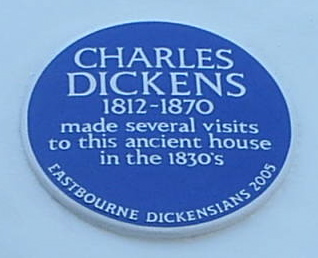
Plaque at ‘Pilgrims’ in Borough Lane

The benefactor of the plaque to Charles Dickens was the Chairperson of the Eastbourne Dickensians, the late Vera Banwell-Clode: it records the author's visits during the 1830s, when he stayed as a guest of the Victorian artist Augustus Egg, RA, who rented the house in Borough Lane. The biologist Professor Thomas Huxley took up residence in Staveley Road in 1890. Frederick Soddy, the eminent radio chemist and Nobel prizewinner, was born at 6 Bolton Road and educated at Eastbourne College. His larger plaque can be seen on School House in Blackwater Road. A blue plaque commissioned by the staff of the former St Mary's Hospital, 1794–1990, was erected in Letheran Place in 2003. It commemorates the soldiers, inmates, patients and staff who lived and worked on the site.

A bronze plaque bearing the inscription “In 1867 this building was the first home of Eastbourne College” can be seen at Spencer Court (formerly Ellesmere Villas), 1 Spencer Road. It was erected by the Arnold Embellishers—a charitable society associated with Eastbourne College—to mark the 140th anniversary of the founding of the school.

Following the loss of the RMS Titanic, an appeal was launched in 1912 for a plaque in honour of James Wesley Woodward, a former cellist with the Eastbourne Municipal Orchestra, who lost his life when the liner sank on her maiden voyage. In 1913, after much disagreement over a location, the marble and bronze plaque was finally placed on Grand Parade opposite the Eastbourne Bandstand. It can still be seen at the lower level, opposite the rostrum of the present bandstand. A royal visit by George V and Queen Mary in March 1935 is commemorated by a plaque on chalet number 2 at Holywell.
