= Eastbourne Bandstand =

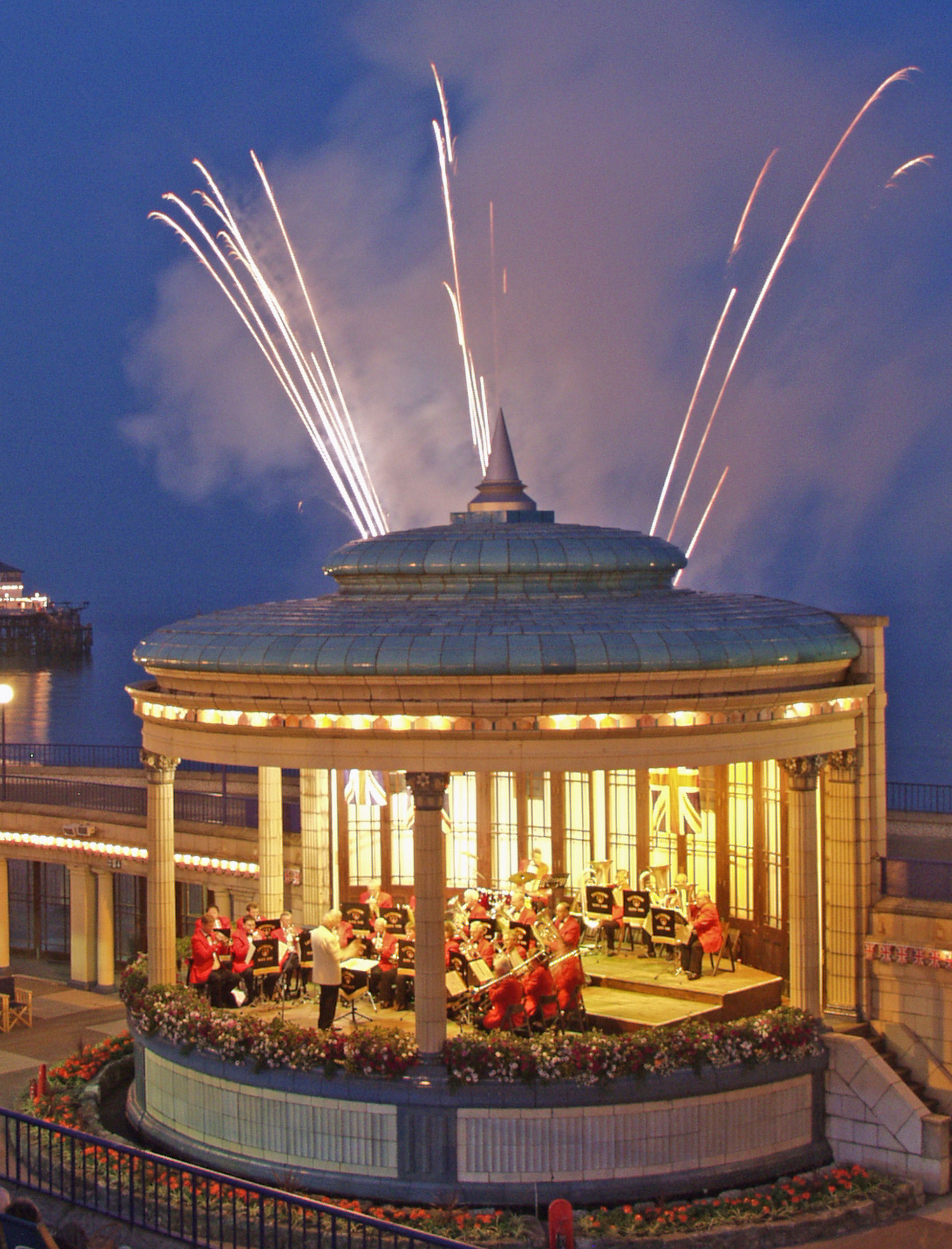
- The Eastbourne Silver Band performing Tchaikovsky's 1812 Overture in 2005

- Location within East Sussex
- 50°45′52.1″N 0°17′22″E
- Type: Bandstand
- Location: Eastbourne
- OS grid reference: TV 61541 98606

History
- Built: 1935

Site notes
- Area: East Sussex
- Architect: Leslie Rosevere
- Architectural style: Neo-Grec

Listed Building – Grade II
- Official name: Bandstand, Colonnade and two covered viewing decks
- Designated: 22 October 1998
- Reference no.: 1385904

The Eastbourne Bandstand is a bandstand on the seafront of the East Sussex coastal town of Eastbourne, with an attached colonnade and viewing decks. Built in 1935 to the designs of the Borough Council Engineer, Leslie Rosevere. Neo-Grec style, constructed of cream faience with some decorative blue, green and black faience, with its unique semi-circular design and blue domed roof; there is no other in the United Kingdom. It has a main arena, middle and upper balconies for seating and originally seated 3,500 but with current health and safety laws this has been reduced to 1,600.

The building of the bandstand formed part of the main seafront improvements, the bandstand itself cost £28,000 and was surmounted with a stainless steel spire. The project engineer was Leslie Rosevere. The first concerts were given on the 28 July 1935 with a total of 10,400 attending all three concerts and paying 3d each. With an audience of 8,000, the bandstand was officially opened on the 5 August 1935 by the Lord Lieutenant of the county, Lord Leconfield.

For many years the bandstand played host to a full programme of military bands. On a daily basis the bands would play from Easter until the end of October. Over the years this was reduced, mainly because audience number was dropping and in 2001 action had to be taken as the costs of the military bands were far out weighing the audience receipts. The local civilian bands were attracting similar audiences to those of military. It was therefore decided that the military band be cut further. If the bandstand were to survive as a musical entertainment venue, new audiences and entertainments had to be found. The introduction of big band nights, rock 'n' roll, Last Night of the Proms and 1812 Firework Night was a significant component of the filling of the financial gap. In 2006, these actions saw the introduction of tribute concerts, which were hugely successful, resulting in the attraction of a significantly larger audience, reviving the bandstand.

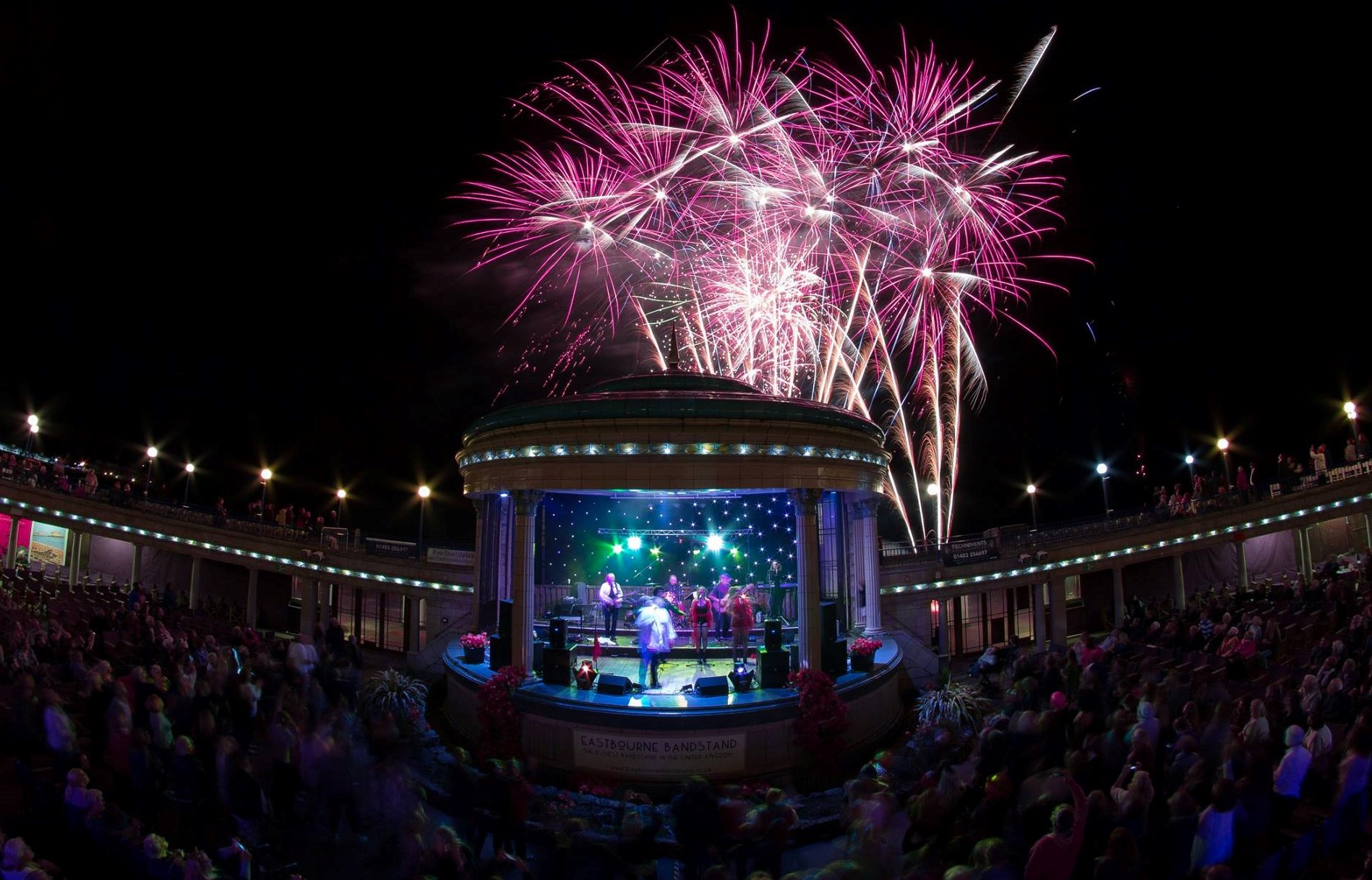
Eastbourne Bandstand Tribute Show

The bandstand to this day plays an important part in the musical entertainment on the south coast offering around 150 concerts per year.

There is a commemorative tablet that was unveiled on 24 October 1914 opposite the bandstand in memory of Eastbourne bandsman John Wesley Woodward, who was one of those playing on the Titanic when it sank on 15 April 1912.

In recent years the bandstand has featured in numerous television programmes such as Foyle's War, and is shown in the opening sequence of BBC South East Today.

== See also ==
- Listed buildings in Eastbourne
