= Langney Priory =

Coordinates: 50.7964°N 0.3145°E

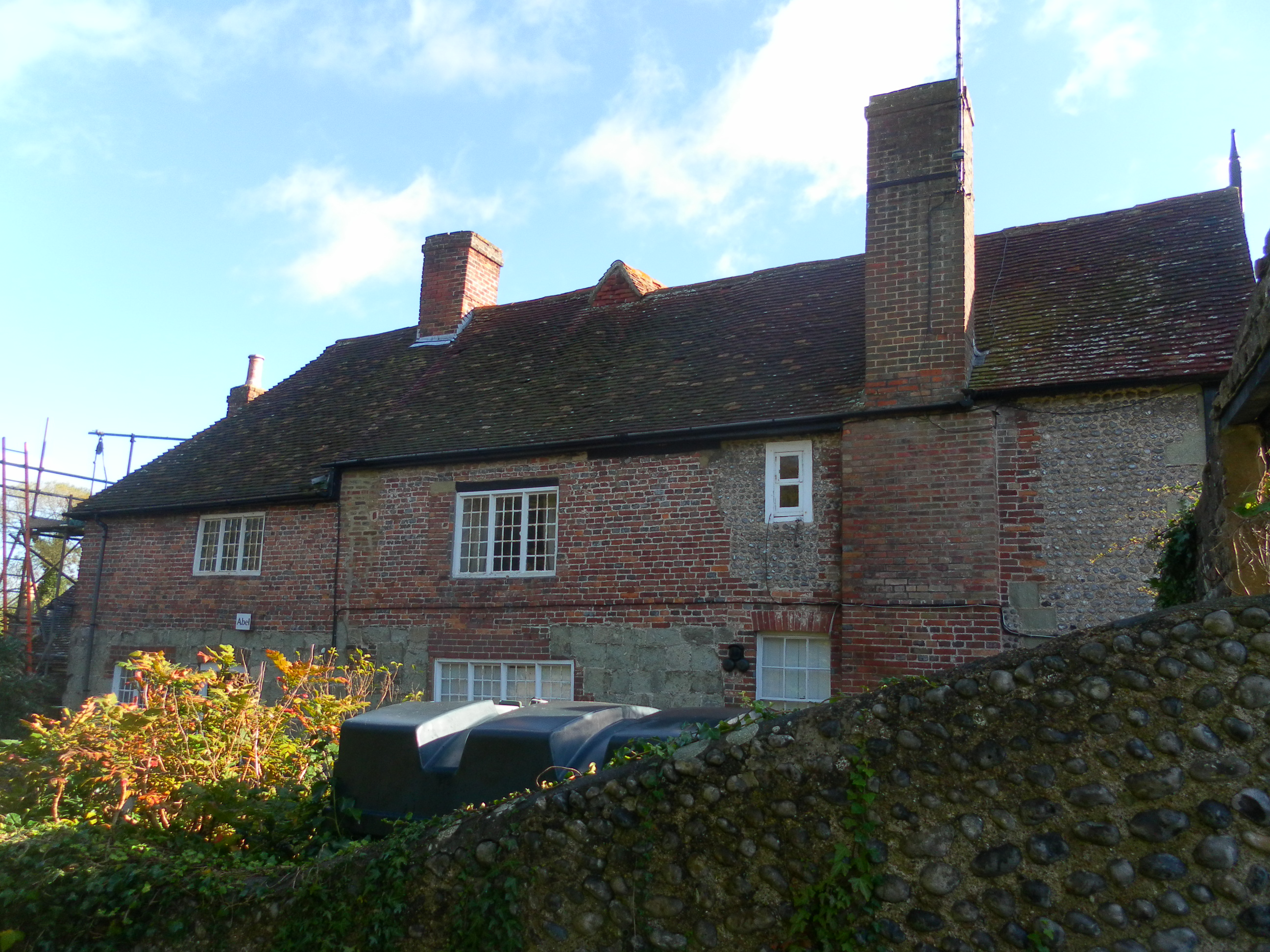
Langney Priory

Langney Priory is the modern name for Langney Grange (now a private house), which served as an agricultural manor of several hundred acres providing produce for Lewes Priory, a Cluniac monastery. It was established before 1121 in the village of Langney, East Sussex, England, and is a Grade II* listed building. In addition to the five-bedroom house and monastery, the property includes a detached three-bedroom cottage, a large outbuilding with two garages, a workshop, and a storeroom.

A planning application for conversion into a hotel and conference venue was submitted in April 2019. In 2020, it was listed for sale at £500,000.

In 2022, the priory was added to English Heritage's list of historic buildings at risk due to disrepair and neglect.

== See also ==
- Listed buildings in Eastbourne
- List of monastic houses in East Sussex
