= Langney =

Suburb of Eastbourne, East Sussex, England

Coordinates: 50.80154°N 0.31483°E

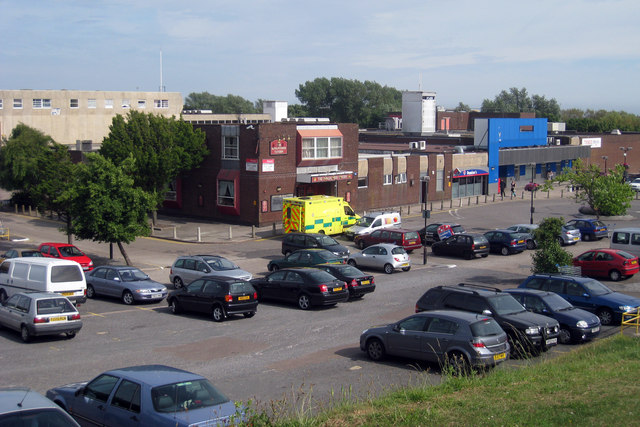
- Langney Shopping Centre

- Location within East Sussex
- Population: 10,706 (2011.Ward)
- OS grid reference: TQ626029
- District: Eastbourne
- Shire county: East Sussex
- Region: South East
- Country: England
- Sovereign state: United Kingdom
- Post town: EASTBOURNE
- Postcode district: BN23
- Dialling code: 01323
- Police: Sussex
- Fire: East Sussex
- Ambulance: South East Coast
- UK Parliament: Eastbourne

Langney is a distinct area of Eastbourne, East Sussex, located on the eastern side of the popular seaside resort. The original village and priory have since been incorporated into the main town of Eastbourne, and Langney was identified as a single self-contained polling ward within the Borough of Eastbourne until 2002.

== Etymology ==
The etymology of Langney is from the Anglo-Saxon root for Long (lang) and Island (ey). Other local place names contain the suffix 'ey' with this historic meaning because the sea level was rather higher in the pre-Conquest period and areas of higher land stood out as 'islands' or rather 'eys'. Pevensey shares the same etymology. Langney proper - the 'Long Island' - thus refers to the higher part i.e. where the shopping centre now is.

== Langney Priory ==
Langney contains the Grade II Listed Langney Priory. The oldest part of this building dates to the twelfth century. It was built by Cluniac monks from the very much larger Priory of St Pancras at Lewes. This lesser building at Langney was thus a monastic grange of the senior house. Langney Priory which had been scheduled for demolition in the 1950s was as of 2019 undergoing redevelopment.

== Local governance ==
Since the boundary changes of 2002 the Langney village became part of St. Anthony's ward, Langney point became part of Sovereign ward and the remaining northern part of Langney became the new Langney ward. As of 2017 the Langney ward was held by the Liberal Democrats and represented by Cllrs Harun Miah, Alan Shuttleworth and Troy Tester at Eastbourne Borough Council and Cllr Alan Shuttleworth at East Sussex County Council.

== Community ==
Langney has grown in recent years (especially since 1970) and is contiguous to Langney Point, which mainly comprises newer properties built on shingle. These properties extend down to the English Channel and the original Eastbourne "Promenade" has been extended eastwards to Langney Point. North of old Langney Village is naturally known as "North Langney" which, once again, consists mainly of newer housing, but there are a few older properties which have seen a considerable change to the local landscape from farmland to suburbia.

Langney also has a popular shopping centre (built in 1973)—including small branches of Tesco and Boots—and has nine schools within its boundaries, the Bishop Bell Church Of England School (Now called St Catherine's), the Causeway School (Now known as The Turing School), Langney Primary School, Tollgate Community Junior School, West Rise Community Infant School, West Rise Junior School, Shinewater Primary School, the Haven Voluntary Aided C E Methodist Primary School and Hazel Court Special School. Langney is mostly made up of housing estate, the main housing estates in Langney are Langney Estate, Kingsmere & Kings Park Estate, Painters Estate, the Birds Estate and Shinewater Estate.

== Sport ==
Langney Sports Club provides a centre for archery, snooker and darts as well as two bars. Adjacent to Langney Sports Club is the home ground of Eastbourne Borough, the largest football team in the town of Eastbourne. They play in the National League South.

== See also ==
- Shinewater
