= Mayfield Baptist Chapel =

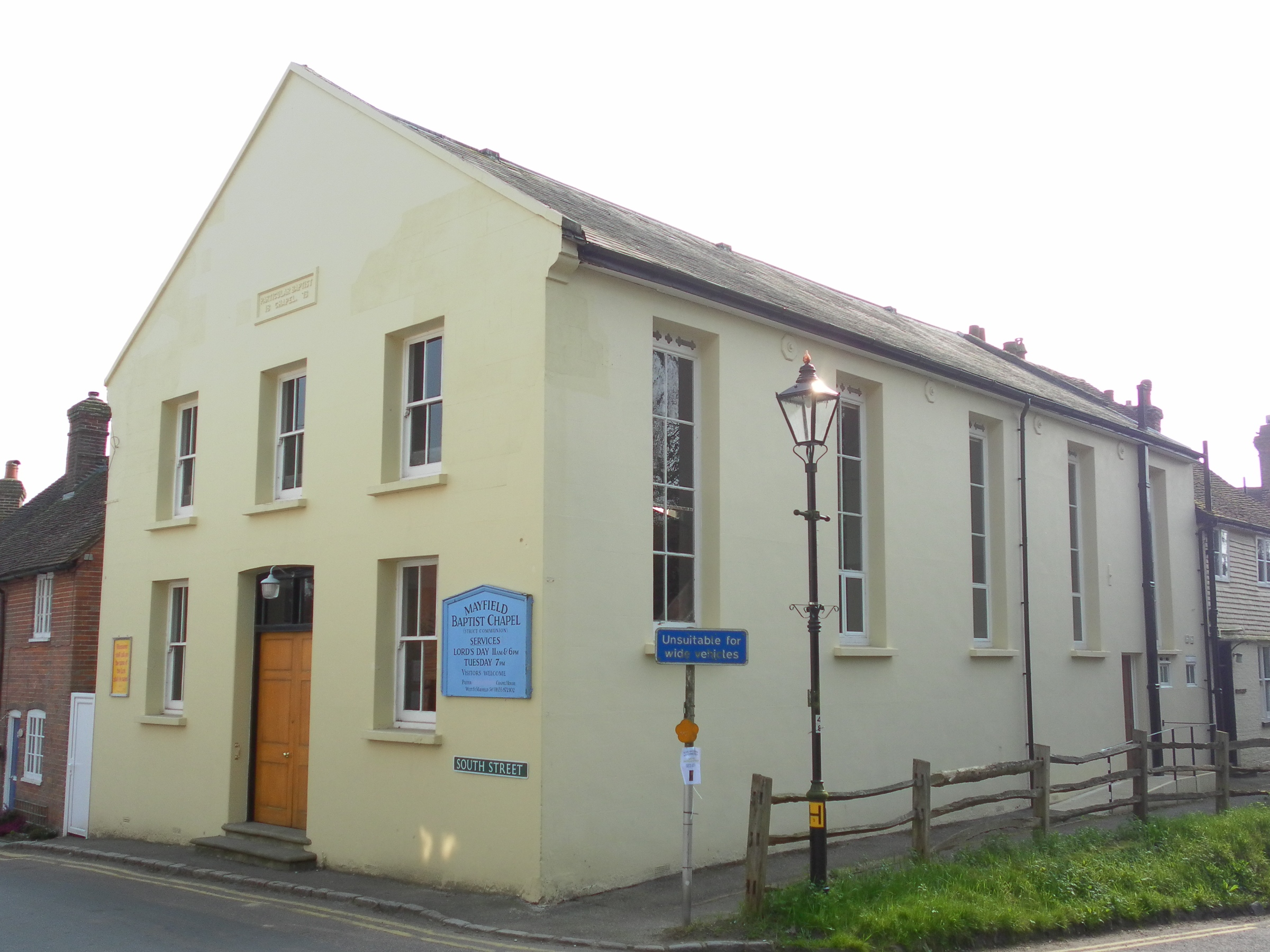
- The chapel in 2011, seen from the north
- Mayfield Baptist Chapel
- 51.0197°N 0.2584°E
- OS grid reference: TQ 58494 26907
- Location: South Street, Mayfield, East Sussex TN20 6DA
- Country: England
- Denomination: Baptist
- Churchmanship: Strict Baptist
- Website: mayfieldchapel.uk/

History
- Status: Church
- Founded: c. 1830

Architecture
- Functional status: Active
- Style: Vernacular
- Completed: 1873

Mayfield Baptist Chapel, previously known as Mayfield Strict Baptist Chapel, is a place of worship in the village of Mayfield, part of the Wealden District of East Sussex, England. The present chapel was built in 1873 on the site of a predecessor which had opened some years before—possibly as early as the late 18th century. A Strict Baptist church was formally constituted in 1871 when the minister at the time, Eli Page, adopted these views; previously it had simply been a "preaching place" serving Christians with various Protestant Nonconformist views. The simple Vernacular-style building remains in use as a Baptist chapel, though the association to the Gospel Standard has now relinquished.

== History ==
East Sussex was a hotbed of Protestant Nonconformity from the 17th century, and a form of Calvinist doctrine "explicitly rooted in 16th-century puritanism" was particularly significant in the county. The village of Mayfield was unusual for its "strong Roman Catholic atmosphere": Catholicism "was all but extinct" in East Sussex by 1780, and the few adherents "were viewed with suspicion and were carefully watched". Nevertheless, Nonconformity had a presence by around 1830, or possibly as early as the late 18th century or early 19th century, when a chapel was built at the junction of West Street and South Street. (A date of 1815 has also been suggested, and the 1851 religious census gives 1801 as the date of foundation.) It was independent and Calvinistic in style, not being affiliated with any Nonconformist denomination at this time; it was instead built by a local man, Mr Stone, as a "preaching place" for a minister called William Burch who had previously ministered in Staplehurst, Kent. The terms of Stone's will required the chapel "to be maintained until the death of Burch". Burch died in 1863, and the chapel was closed; it was then put up for sale in June 1865. A local man who wished to see the chapel reopened bought it for £85 and called Eli Page to the ministry. Page's theological views changed over the next few years: initially denominationally independent, he became a Strict Baptist in 1871 and constituted a church along those lines in the same year. Other Strict Baptist visiting ministers had also preached at the chapel since 1866.

A baptistery was constructed in 1871, but the old chapel was structurally unsound and had to be dismantled. Some land next to the chapel was available, so the building was rebuilt on a larger scale and reopened on 9 May 1873. It is a plain Vernacular building with a rendered façade and a datestone in the gable.

The doctrinal shift from independent Calvinism towards Strict Baptist theology was common locally. "Many—even a majority of—Strict Baptist causes in Sussex have Independent origins", often prompted by the appointment of a new pastor or, as in Mayfield's case, the conversion to Strict Baptist beliefs of the incumbent. At the time of the 1851 religious census, Mayfield Chapel—like many other independent Calvinistic chapels in Sussex—described itself simply as "Independent", a description which was also associated with chapels which later became Congregationalist.

The Church is no longer a part of the Gospel Standard, and has also removed the distinction of 'Strict' from its name, and stands as only an Independent Baptist Church. The Authorised Version of the Bible is still used, and Reformed, Calvinistic theology continues to be the theme of the preaching, but association to the Gospel Standard is very much rejected by the membership.

Since 2010, numbers had declined rapidly. Since around 2015 numbers in the morning and evening services were typically around 5–7. However, in recent years the Church congregation has grown, and now regularly seats 25–35 in the morning and evening services respectfully. The membership as a result has continued to grow.

== Administration and services ==
On 22 September 1875, with the name Baptist Chapel, the chapel was registered for worship in accordance with the Places of Worship Registration Act 1855. Six days later it was also registered for the solemnisation of marriages in accordance with the Marriage Act 1836.

Services are held on Sunday mornings at 11AM and evenings at 6PM; there is a weekly prayer meeting on Tuesday evenings at 7.15PM. The Church has had no pastor since 2010 when the latest Pastor - Philip Kinderman - passed away. "Ezekiel: A Pastor's Study". The Parsons Pages. Nowadays, there are two elders who preach on rotation, and occasionally itinerate ministers visit and lead services. TraditionallyA Selection of Hymns for Public Worship, a Gospel Standard Strict Baptist hymnbook compiled by William Gadsby, was used in all services, however these days Christian Hymns (First/1977 Edition) is used primarily, with the Gadsby's hymnbook being used occasionally. The Lord's Table service is held once a month, at the end of the first morning service of each month. The Church continues to affirm its Strict Baptist roots by practicing closed communion, whereby those who wish to take part must be Baptised believers. The Church website indicated that those wishing to take communion should speak to a 'deacon' first. This differs from the practice of other Strict & Particular Baptist Churches (particularly those still affiliated to the Gospel Standard) since only members of the Church, or members of a fellow Gospel Standard Church, may partake in the Lord's Table.

== 1851 census return ==
The return was supplied by Nicholas Stone, describing himself as "owner", and is described as "Independent Chapel": "a house converted into a Chapel about the year 1801 and enlarged in the year 1835". All sittings were free (not subject to pew rents), and services were held once a month on Sunday mornings and afternoons and, separately, once a month on Sunday evenings. Estimated attendances for the morning and afternoon services were "between 300 and 400"; for the evening services, "between 80 and 150".

== See also ==
- List of current places of worship in Wealden
- List of Strict Baptist churches
- Media related to Mayfield Baptist Chapel at Wikimedia Commons

== Bibliography ==
- Chambers, Ralph (1953). The Strict Baptist Chapels of England: Sussex. Vol. 2. Thornton Heath: Ralph Chambers.
- Elleray, D. Robert (2004). Sussex Places of Worship. Worthing: Optimus Books. ISBN 0-9533132-7-1.
- Homan, Roger (1997). "Mission and Fission: the organization of Huntingtonian and Calvinistic Baptist causes in Sussex in the 18th and 19th centuries". Sussex Archaeological Collections. 135. Lewes: Sussex Archaeological Society: 265–282. doi:10.5284/1085045. ISSN 0143-8204.
- Howard, Eve, ed. (1992). Mayfield: a Short Historic Guide (Illustrated) (3rd ed.). Mayfield: Mayfield Local History Society.
- Vickers, John A., ed. (1989). The Religious Census of Sussex 1851. Lewes: Sussex Record Society. ISBN 085445-036-X.
- Whatmore, Leonard E. (1977). The Story of Our Lady of Ransom Eastbourne. Eastbourne: Our Lady of Ransom Church.
