= Gospel Standard Strict Baptists =

Founder
- William Gadsby

Regions with significant populations
- UK (predominately England), Australia, US, Pakistan

Scriptures
- The Bible, usually KJV

Website
- https://www.gospelstandard.org.uk/

Gospel Standard Strict Baptists, also known as Gospel Standard Baptists, SBs or Esbies, are a Protestant Baptist Christian denomination that reject the "free offer of grace", and became institutionally distinct when a magazine of the same name was first published in 1835 by William Gadsby. This magazine is the tenth oldest monthly magazine still in print in the British Isles.

All Gospel Standard Strict Baptist churches are affiliated with and recognised by the publishers of the Gospel Standard.

== History ==
The Gospel Standard Strict Baptist denomination arose in the early 19th century in opposition to the perceivably liberal Baptist Union, which was itself an attempt to unite loosely connected Reformed Baptist denomination.

A prominent but controversial Reformed Baptist preacher, William Gadsby, together with his son John, a printer, launched the Gospel Standard magazine in Manchester in 1835 to promote Gadsby’s teachings and to help organise the Churches which held strongly to Calvinist soteriology and refused to join the Baptist Union into their own visible, institutional church.

== Beliefs ==
The beliefs of the Gospel Standard Strict Baptists are contained within the Articles of Faith and Rules, which among other things affirm the infallibility of Scripture, the Nicene view of the Trinity and salvation by grace alone through faith alone.

Some of the Articles are taken from the Westminster Confession of Faith (1646) and the London Baptist Confession of Faith (1689), while others are written by William Gadsby, John M’Kenzie, and Joseph Charles Philpot themselves.
