= John Kent =

John Kent may refer to:

== Politicians ==
- John Kent (died 1630) (1559–1630), MP for Devizes
- John Kent (died 1669) (c. 1612–1669), English politician, MP for Devizes
- John Kent (died 1413), MP for Reading
- John Kent (MP for Bedford) (fl. 1399–1435), English politician
- John Kent (Newfoundland politician) (1805–1872), premier of Newfoundland

== Others ==
- Jan Klán (1911–1986), later John Kent, Czech fighter ace of World War II
- John A. Kent (1914–1985), Canadian fighter ace in World War II
- John Kent (cartoonist) (1937–2003), New Zealand cartoonist
- John Rodolphus Kent (died 1837), Royal Navy officer and trader in New Zealand
- John Kent (hymnist) (1766–1843) English Calvinist Baptist hymn writer
- John Kent (police officer) (1795–1886), British police constable
- John Kent (priest) (c. 1699–1778), rector of the Irish College, Antwerp and president of the Irish Pastoral College in Louvain
- John Kent (numismatist) (1928–2000), British numismatist and archaeologist
- John David Kent, an American country band, with the lead singer John David Kent or John Kent

== See also ==
- Jack Kent (disambiguation)
- Jonathan Kent (disambiguation)
- Kent (surname)
