= Richard Burnham =

Richard Burnham may refer to:

- Richard Burnham (clergyman) (1711–1752), English clergyman and biographer
- Richard Burnham (minister) (1749–1810), English Baptist minister and hymn-writer
- Rick Burnham, a character in The Boys
