= List of Strict Baptist churches =

This is a list of Strict Baptist churches The term 'strict' refers to the strict or closed position held with regard to membership and communion. Such people are referred to as Strict and Particular Baptists.

== Gospel Standard churches ==
Many Strict Baptist churches are affiliated with and recognized by the publishers of the Gospel Standard, a Strict Baptist magazine first published in 1835. Churches that align themselves with the Gospel Standard Magazine are known as "Gospel Standard Baptists" or "Gospel Standard Strict Baptists".

=== Outside the United Kingdom ===
- Zion Chapel, Melbourne, Australia
- Ebenezer Chapel, Ryde, New South Wales, Australia
- Zion's Hope Chapel, Nobleford, Alberta, Canada
- Hope Chapel, Chilliwack, British Columbia, Canada
- PSSS Christchurch Bierton Particular Baptists, Rahim Yar Khan, Pakistan
- The Old Paths Chapel, Choteau, Montana, USA
- Zion Baptist Church, Grand Rapids, Michigan USA
- Hope Strict Baptist Church, Sheboygan, Wisconsin, USA

=== United Kingdom ===
Congregation	Town	Image	Notes
Bethel Chapel	Allington, Wiltshire		Built 1828
Zoar Chapel	Ashwell, Hertfordshire		
Jireh Chapel	Attleborough, Nuneaton, Warwickshire		
Hope Chapel	Barton-le-Clay, Bedfordshire		
Old Bexley Baptist Chapel	Bexley		
Ebenezer Chapel	Biddenden, Kent		The Chapel was built in 1880 by James Hickmott, a local farmer and a deacon at Tilden Chapel in Smarden. John Kemp of Wadhurst in Sussex was invited to become its first pastor.
Providence Chapel	Biggleswade, Bedfordshire		
Providence Chapel	Birkenhead		
Bierton Strict and Particular Baptist Chapel	Bierton, Buckinghamshire		The church was formed in 1831 and the trust deed referred to its place of worship as a School Room. This was enlarged in 1835. The witness signature on the trust deed is a Mr Warberton. Jr. The Bierton church became a listed Gospel Standard cause in 1982 and the Gospel Standard Articles of Religion and Rules were adopted by the church. The final worship meeting at the chapel was held on 22 December 2002. And the trust deed was given to the Association of Grace Baptist Churches Limited who registered the property in their name in order to sell the chapel. The Chapel is now listed as a monument and is a domestic dwelling
Hope Chapel	Blackboys, East Sussex		This red-brick Vernacular-style building was built in 1875. The walls are rendered. From its inception, it has catered for Gospel Standard Baptists.
Strict Baptist Chapel	Blunsdon Hill, Wiltshire		
Ebenezer Chapel	Bodle Street Green, East Sussex		An Independent Baptist congregation was founded here in 1835 by a Horsham-based preacher. The present chapel is aligned to the Gospel Standard movement and was built in 1864. It is timber-framed, partly weatherboarded and rendered, and has been extended several times. There is a gable above the entrance porch.
Mount Zion Chapel	Bournemouth		Demolished by 2009 and later replaced by a residential property with a sign "Mount Zion, 7 Wootton Mount"
Zion Chapel	Brabourne Lees, Kent		
Salem Chapel	Braintree, Essex		
Galeed Chapel	Brighton		
Brixton Tabernacle	Stockwell Rd, Brixton, S London		The church was started in 1867. The current (3rd) chapel, which was opened in 1975, is almost opposite the site of the previous chapel, now the skate-board park.
Rehoboth Chapel	Bromley		
Strict Baptist Chapel	Broughton Gifford		The Broughton Gifford Strict Baptist Chapel was founded in 1806. Dressed limestone, Welsh slate hipped roof. Entrance in gable end facing road. Two-storey, 3-window front with lean-to porch with double planked doors, round-arched fixed window either side, gallery over with three round-arched windows. Right and left returns have two round-arched windows with central mullions. Single-storey schoolroom attached to rear with 16-pane sashes and planked doors, rear window to chapel blocked. English Heritage Building ID: 433419
Zoar Chapel	Canterbury		
Salem Chapel	Carshalton, Surrey		
Old Baptist Chapel	Chippenham		
Strict Baptist Chapel	Clifton		
Strict Baptist Chapel	Colnbrook		
Strict Baptist Chapel	Coppice		
Cranbrook Strict Baptist Chapel	Cranbrook		The Cranbrook Strict Baptist Chapel, is a Strict Baptist place of worship in the town of Cranbrook in the English county of Kent. The chapel was built in 1787. Grade II, ID 169067
Providence Chapel	Croydon, Surrey		Closed as a Strict Baptist Church in 2017 (source: picture description linked by clicking on picture); as at 2024 the home of Triumphant Global Ministries church. TGM Churches on Facebook
Zoar Strict Baptist Chapel	Dicker, East Sussex		Originally called The Dicker Chapel, this 400-capacity building dates from 1837. On a main road in a remote spot, it serves a wide area and had extensive stables for worshippers arriving on horseback. The Classical-style stuccoed brick chapel, enlarged and refronted in 1874, has a pediment, porch and pilasters.
Providence Chapel	East Peckham		
Grove Road Strict Baptist Church	Eastbourne		J.J. Skinner's 1881 red brick and stone chapel replaced an earlier Strict Baptist place of worship, Marsh Chapel, which was founded in the first few years of the 19th century. Reordering was carried out inside in 2002. The church is aligned with the Gospel Standard movement.
Strict Baptist Chapel	Fenstanton		
Providence Chapel	Gravesend, Kent		
Hope Chapel	Great Yeldham, Essex		Built in 1875, this red-brick Vernacular-style building is attached to a house. The walls are rendered. From its inception, it has catered for Gospel Standard Baptists.
Strict Baptist Chapel	Grove		
Bethel Chapel Guildford	Guildford, Surrey		The Bethel Chapel, The Bars, Guildford, is a Strict Baptist Chapel affiliated to the Gospel Standard group of Strict & Particular Baptist churches. The Church was established in 1879 and the present building opened in 1910. Bethel still adheres to its original Articles of Faith and worship is conducted much as it was a century ago.
Zoar Chapel	Handcross, West Sussex		A round-windowed, red and yellow brick building of 1888 replaced the village's first Baptist chapel, first recorded in 1782.
Cave Adullam Chapel	Haslingden, Lancashire		
Ebenezer Chapel	Haynes, Bedfordshire		
Jireh Chapel	Haywards Heath		Sussex has many 19th-century Independent and Baptist chapels in this Vernacular style: a tiled, gabled roof, porch, and red-brick walls with round-arched windows. This example was built in 1879 by William Knight, a horticulturist who was also the chapel's first pastor. It is a Gospel Standard movement chapel.
Ebenezer Chapel	Heathfield (Broad Oak)		An Independent Baptist congregation was founded here in 1835 by a Horsham-based preacher. The present chapel is aligned to the Gospel Standard movement and was built in 1864. It is timber-framed, partly weatherboarded and rendered, and has been extended several times. There is a gable above the entrance porch.
Strict Baptist Chapel	Hedge End		Whilst not formally aligned to the Gospel Standard magazine, Hedge End Chapel currently shares a pastor with the Gospel Standard-affiliated Salem Chapel in Portsmouth. The website for the chapel is at hedgeendchapel.org.uk.
Ebenezer Chapel	Horam, East Sussex		Also known as Pick Hill Chapel, this small, isolated building was opened in 1873 to replace an earlier chapel founded in about 1849 by Eli Page. It has been aligned with the Gospel Standard Baptist movement since 1864. The Vernacular-style structure has an entrance porch.
Hope Chapel	Horsham		Horsham's second Strict Baptist chapel had its origins in meetings in a public hall in March 1900. The congregation moved several times, but on 2 December 1903 their new red-brick square-windowed chapel on Oakhill Road was inaugurated, and worship has continued there ever since. The three founders were from Kent.
Providence Chapel	Irthlingborough, Northamptonshire		
Rehoboth Chapel	Jarvis Brook		This red- and blue-brick building dates from 1876. Its Gospel Standard Strict Baptist congregation, founded in 1852, maintains links with the Forest Fold chapel on the other side of Crowborough. Seceders from that chapel founded the Jarvis Brook cause in 1852; they met in a schoolroom at first.
Strict Baptist Chapel	Lakenheath		
Strict Baptist Chapel	Lamberhurst		
Mount Zion Chapel	Leatherhead, Surrey		
Ebenezer Chapel	Leeds		Ebenezer Particular Baptist Chapel, 15 Grove Lane, Headingley, Leeds LS6 4DP. Opened 1967. This replaced a chapel of 1917 at Mount Preston, which in turn replaced a chapel in the city centre opened in 1862 for a congregation then meeting in Rockingham Street,
Ebenezer Chapel	Leeds		7 Rodley Lane, Rodley, Leeds LS13 No longer a place of worship
Zion Chapel	Leicester		
Strict Baptist Chapel	Little Downham		
Bethel Strict Baptist Chapel	Luton		An independent church at which Benjamin Ashworth Ramsbottom formerly preached as pastor from 1967 until 2021 and continued regularly until his death in January 2023.
Ebenezer Chapel	Luton		
Priory Chapel	Maidstone		
Strict Baptist Chapel	Manchester		
Ebenezer Church	Matfield		
Mayfield Baptist Chapel	Mayfield and Five Ashes, East Sussex		This 250-capacity building has a much smaller congregation than in its 19th-century heyday, but remains in use. It has stood on its village-centre corner site since 1873, but Baptist worship in the Mayfield area has a much longer history.
Ebenezer Chapel	Melksham, Wiltshire		The Ebenezer Chapel, is a Strict Baptist place of worship in the town of Melksham in the English county of Wiltshire. The chapel was built in 1835. It has been a Grade II listed building since 1985.
Hope Chapel	Mount Bures		
Kirkland Baptist Chapel	Nateby, Lancashire, near Garstang		The Strict Baptist cause at Nateby dates back to 1828 when four persons were baptized in a pond at Primrose Hill on 14 May 1828. The present chapel was built in 1877.
Ebenezer Chapel	Newquay, Cornwall		The Ebenezer Baptist Chapel is one of the oldest religious building in Newquay, and was founded in 1822.
Providence Chapel	Northampton		
Zoar Chapel	Norwich, Norfolk		
Hope Chapel	Nottingham		
Strict Baptist Chapel	Oakington		
Ebenezer Chapel	Ossett, West Yorkshire		
Salem Chapel	Portsmouth		Salem Chapel is in the Buckland area of the city. It was registered for the solemnisation of marriages in June 1970.
Zion Chapel	Prestwood, Buckinghamshire		Strict Baptist Chapel, Prestwood. This neat-looking chapel, which dates from 1950, is situated in Kiln Road, Prestwood, HP16 9DH. The cemetery is across the road from the chapel.
Zoar Chapel	Reading, Berkshire		
Hope Chapel	Redhill, Surrey		
Ebenezer Strict Baptist Chapel, Richmond	Richmond		
Ebenezer Chapel	Ripley, Surrey		This chapel was built in 1812 and is still used for worship.
Hope Chapel	Rochdale		
Zoar Chapel	Romford, Essex		
Providence Chapel	Rotherfield		Baptist worship began in Rotherfield in 1823, but the congregation split in the 1850s and seceders founded Providence Chapel in 1858. After early difficulties, the cause prospered (whereas the original "Bethel Chapel" folded in the 1870s), and it has been part of the Gospel Standard movement since the 1890s. The red-brick, stone-quoined chapel has arched windows.
Bethel Chapel	Rye, East Sussex		This distinctive Neoclassical building—stuccoed, with the name bethel inscribed above the porch—retains the appearance it had in 1858, when it was built. Charlotte Smith, the wife of a former Mayor of Rye, founded it after experiencing a spiritual conversion.
Strict Baptist Church	Scayness Hill		The village's small Strict Baptist chapel dates from 1875 and was extended in 2008. The red-brick building, with round-headed, segmental-arched windows, stands just north of St Augustine of Canterbury Church. It is aligned with the Gospel Standard Baptist movement.
Hope Chapel	Sedgley, West Midlands		
Moden Hill Chapel	Sedgley, West Midlands		
Providence Chapel	Shoreham by Sea		This small stuccoed building, in a simple Classical style with deeply recessed windows, was opened in 1867 to replace a nearby meeting room. The chapel is aligned with the Gospel Standard movement.
Rehoboth Chapel	Sible Hedingham, Essex		
Ebenezer Baptist Church	Silverhill, Hastings		This small brick building on the Ponswood industrial estate was originally a Gospel Hall used by Plymouth Brethren. It is now aligned with the Gospel Standard Baptist movement.
Bethel Chapel	South Chard		
Bethel Chapel	South Moreton		
Bethesda Chapel	Southampton		
Strict Baptist Chapel	Southery		
Southill Strict Baptist Chapel	Southill, Bedfordshire		Strict Baptist Chapel, Southill, Beds. The chapel was built in the High Street in 1805; the cause was founded in 1693.
Providence Chapel	Staplehurst		
Hope Chapel	Stotfold, Bedfordshire		
Little Zoar Chapel	Studley		
Swanwick Shore Strict Baptist Chapel	Lower Swanwick		The Swanwick Shore Strict Baptist Chapel was built in 1844. The chapel stands on the junction of Quay Lane and Bridge Road in the Swanwick Shore conservation area.
Strict Baptist Chapel	Swavesey		
Rehoboth Chapel	Swindon		
Jireh Chapel	Tenterden, Kent		
Providence Chapel	Thurlstone		
Hanover Chapel	Tunbridge Wells, Kent		
The Halve Strict Baptist Chapel	Trowbridge		The Halve Strict Baptist Chapel in Trowbridge is a Gospel Standard Chapel formed in the 1800s
Foresters Strict Baptist Chapel	Uckfield		The 1789 Baptist church in Uckfield, originally Strict Baptist, had a General Baptist pastor by the early 20th century. Strict Baptist members of the congregation seceded in 1920 and founded a new chapel next to Foresters Hall in the south of the town. The Gospel Standard movement is followed.
Strict Baptist Chapel	Uffington, Oxfordshire		
Wattisham Strict Baptist Chapel (not in The Gospel Standard)	Wattisham		In 1780 a permanent chapel was built on the current site. In 1825 it was replaced by the current building under the pastorate of John Cooper.
Bethel Chapel	Wivelsfield, East Sussex		The cause was founded in 1763 by members of a chapel at nearby Ditchling; Henry Booker and other worshippers seceded and began to meet at Wivelsfield after hearing a sermon by George Whitefield. Although some members of the new church soon returned to the Ditchling congregation, the cause thrived under Booker's leadership, and the present chapel—a building of "quiet and unassuming elegance" set in its own graveyard—was erected in 1780. It has served the Strict Baptist community continuously since then, and members founded other chapels elsewhere in Sussex during the 18th and 19th centuries. English Heritage has listed the building at Grade II for its architectural and historical importance.
Waddesdon Hill Strict Baptist Chapel	Waddesdon		Build by Francis Cox in 1792 and the trust deed described the worshippers as Calvinistic Protestant Deserters. The Church was a Gospel Standard listed cause but was closed for worship in 1974. The trust deed was given to The Association of Strict Baptist Churches in 1982 who sold it to the Friends of Friendless Churches. The last commemoration meeting was held at the chapel on 16 August 2014.

== Other Strict Baptist churches ==
The term Strict Baptist was used up until recent decades by other sizeable groups of Calvinistic Baptist churches in England that did not adhere to the Gospel Standard Articles or Magazine. Many were members of regional Strict Baptist Associations, but from about 1980 onwards assemblies, regional associations, and charities connected with this movement gradually adopted the appellation "Grace Baptist". Lists of churches can be found on the websites of the various regional Grace Baptist associations.

The churches listed below were added to this section before the above information about Grace Baptists, and may well be unrelated.

- Bethel Strict Baptist Chapel, Robertsbridge
- Ebenezer Particular Baptist Chapel, Hastings
- Providence Strict Baptist Chapel, Burgess Hill
- Rye Particular Baptist Chapel
- Shover's Green Baptist Chapel
- Strict and Particular Baptist Chapel, Waddesdon
- Zion Chapel, Newick

== See also ==
- Grace Baptist

== Bibliography ==
- Anon. (1975). Hastings & St Leonards Official Guide 1975. Hastings: Hastings Borough Council Tourism and Recreation Department.
- Clarke, David (2012). Bierton Strict and Particular Baptists. Abshott Publications. ISBN 9780953947379.
- Chambers, Ralph (1953). The Strict Baptist Chapels of England: Sussex. Thornton Heath: Ralph Chambers.
- Elleray, D. Robert (1981). The Victorian Churches of Sussex. Chichester: Phillimore & Co. Ltd. ISBN 978-0-85033-378-7.
- Elleray, D. Robert (2004). Sussex Places of Worship. Worthing: Optimus Books. ISBN 978-0-9533132-7-3.
- Ford, Wyn K.; Gabe, A.C. (1981). The Metropolis of Mid Sussex: a History of Haywards Heath. Haywards Heath: Charles Clarke (Haywards Heath) Ltd. ISBN 978-0-9502489-4-3.
- Homan, Roger (1997). "Mission and Fission: the organization of Huntingtonian and Calvinistic Baptist causes in Sussex in the 18th and 19th centuries". Sussex Archaeological Collections. 135. doi:10.5284/1085045. ISSN 0143-8204.
