= A Selection of Hymns for Public Worship =

Hymn book compiled by William Gadsby

A Selection of Hymns for Public Worship is a hymn book compiled by William Gadsby, a minister of the Gospel Standard Strict Baptists in England. First published in the 19th century, it is still in current use.

== History ==
William Gadsby, a Strict and Particular Baptist minister, first published the selection of hymns in 1814 in Manchester, printed at the printing works owned by his son John Gadsby. Later in 1838, William Gadsby published a later edition. After his death in 1844, a further, enlarged edition was published, now including a second supplement selected by J. C. Philpot, another Strict Baptist Minister.

== Contents ==
This hymnal contains 1156 hymns (words only) by various authors. These are primarily, but not exclusively, from the Calvinistic stream of Protestant thought.

=== Authors ===
The edition currently available includes the following authors, here listed by number of hymns used. Joseph Hart (219); William Gadsby (173); Isaac Watts (145) John Berridge (72); John Newton (63) John Kent (51); Charles Wesley (41); Thomas Kelly (34); Samuel Medley (31); Anne Steele (27); Augustus M. Toplady (24); Richard Burnham (22); Henry Fowler (20); William Cowper (18); Joseph Swain (18); Daniel Herbert (12); Benjamin Beddome (10); John Fawcett (10); William Hammond (10); John Stevens (9); John Adams (9); Philip Doddridge (8); John Cennick (6).

There are other authors with fewer hymns in this book, as well as eight anonymous contributions.

=== Examples of Gadsby's own writing ===
Gadsby's own hymns are considered to be 'of high standard', such as number 667, regarded worthy of Watts and Charles Wesley, who in their lifetime, were both highly admired for their hymn writing abilities.

1 IMMORTAL honours rest on Jesus' head;
My God, my Portion, and my Living Bread;
In him I live, upon him cast my care;
He saves from death, destruction, and despair.

2 He is my Refuge in each deep distress;
The Lord my strength & glorious righteousness;
Through floods and flames he leads me safely on,
And daily makes his sovereign goodness known.

3 My every need he richly will supply;
Nor will his mercy ever let me die;
In him there dwells a treasure all divine,
And matchless grace has made that treasure mine.

4 O that my soul could love and praise him more,
His beauties trace, his majesty adore;
Live near his heart, upon his bosom lean;
Obey his voice, and all his will esteem.

The third line of the last verse echoes the thought of Charles Wesley's hymn Thou Shepherd of Israel, and mine, with the line "Eternally held in Thy heart".

Another example from William Gadsby illustrates the Calvinistic flavour of this book. Hymn number 530 describes election in Calvinistic language.

1 ELECTION is a truth divine,
As absolute as free;
Works ne'er can make the blessing mine;
'Tis God's own wise decree.

5 Nor law, nor death, nor hell, nor sin,
Can alter his decree;
The elect eternal life shall win,
And all God's glory see.

== Availability ==
The hymnal is currently available in these editions : "Buckram" (standard pew edition), 936p., ISBN 978-0-9510796-2-1; Large print version, 636p., ISBN 978-0-9510796-5-2; Large print (leather), 936p., ISBN 978-0-9510796-3-8,; leather binding and India paper, 895 pp.; hardback, 895 pp.; and a Kivar edition, 473 pp.

The hymn book is used by the Gospel Standard Strict Baptists in England and the United States and a few Old School or Primitive Baptist churches in the United States. Many of the Strict Baptists use the Companion Tune Book, a musical score of 1011 hymn tunes designed as a companion to Gadsby's hymn book. The hymn book was never widely used in churches outside the United Kingdom, but there is some renewed interest in it among Reformed Baptists as devotional poetry.

Gadsby also published Nazarene's Songs, containing about 250 of his own hymns.

== See also ==
- List of English-language hymnals by denomination
