= Walter Gale =

Walter Gale may refer to:

- Walter Gale (schoolmaster), schoolmaster in Mayfield, England
- Walter Augustus Gale (1864–1927), Australian public servant
- Walter Frederick Gale (1865–1945), Australian banker and astronomer

== See also ==
- Walter Gale House
