= Climate of East Anglia =

The climate of East Anglia is generally dry and mild. East Anglia is the driest in the United Kingdom with many areas receiving less than 600 millimetres (24 in) of rainfall a year, and locations such as St Osyth in Essex receiving less than 500 millimetres (20 in) on average. Rainfall is fairly evenly distributed throughout the year.

Maximum temperatures in East Anglia range from 6–10 °C (43–50 °F) in the winter to 20–25 °C (68–77 °F) in the summer, although temperatures have been known to reach 38 °C (100 °F). Sunshine totals tend to be higher towards the coastal areas.

== Climate charts ==
East Anglia regional average

Climate chart (precipitation, max. and min. temperature)
J	F	M	A	M	J	J	A	S	O	N	D
53 7 1	37 7 1	45 10 3	45 12 4	45 16 7	54 19 10	46 22 12	50 22 12	56 19 10	59 14 7	59 10 4	57 8 2
- █ Average max. and min. temperatures in °C
- █ Precipitation totals in mm
Imperial conversion
J	F	M	A	M	J	J	A	S	O	N	D
2.1 44 34	1.5 45 34	1.8 50 37	1.8 54 39	1.8 61 44	2.1 66 49	1.8 71 53	2 71 53	2.2 65 50	2.3 58 45	2.3 50 38	2.2 46 36
- █ Average max. and min. temperatures in °F
- █ Precipitation totals in inches

Lowestoft

Climate chart (precipitation, max. and min. temperature)
J	F	M	A	M	J	J	A	S	O	N	D
51 7 2	35 7 2	40 9 3	42 11 5	40 14 8	47 18 11	44 20 13	51 21 13	53 18 11	58 14 8	61 10 5	55 8 3
- █ Average max. and min. temperatures in °C
- █ Precipitation totals in mm
Imperial conversion
J	F	M	A	M	J	J	A	S	O	N	D
2 44 35	1.4 44 35	1.6 49 38	1.6 52 41	1.6 58 46	1.9 64 51	1.7 68 55	2 69 56	2.1 65 52	2.3 57 47	2.4 50 40	2.2 46 37
- █ Average max. and min. temperatures in °F
- █ Precipitation totals in inches

Wattisham

Climate chart (precipitation, max. and min. temperature)
J	F	M	A	M	J	J	A	S	O	N	D
50 6 1	35 7 1	43 10 2	41 12 4	44 16 7	52 19 10	42 21 12	47 22 12	55 18 10	57 14 7	56 9 4	52 7 2
- █ Average max. and min. temperatures in °C
- █ Precipitation totals in mm
Imperial conversion
J	F	M	A	M	J	J	A	S	O	N	D
1.9 43 33	1.4 44 33	1.7 49 36	1.6 53 39	1.7 60 44	2.1 66 49	1.7 71 53	1.9 71 53	2.2 65 50	2.3 57 45	2.2 49 38	2.1 45 35
- █ Average max. and min. temperatures in °F
- █ Precipitation totals in inches

Marham

Climate chart (precipitation, max. and min. temperature)
J	F	M	A	M	J	J	A	S	O	N	D
55 7 1	39 7 1	50 10 2	47 12 4	48 16 7	56 19 10	44 22 12	51 22 12	55 19 10	60 14 7	63 10 3	55 7 2
- █ Average max. and min. temperatures in °C
- █ Precipitation totals in mm
Imperial conversion
J	F	M	A	M	J	J	A	S	O	N	D
2.2 44 33	1.5 45 33	1.9 50 36	1.8 54 39	1.9 61 44	2.2 66 49	1.7 71 53	2 71 53	2.2 65 49	2.4 58 44	2.5 49 38	2.2 45 35
- █ Average max. and min. temperatures in °F
- █ Precipitation totals in inches

Cambridge

Climate chart (precipitation, max. and min. temperature)
J	F	M	A	M	J	J	A	S	O	N	D
45 7 1	33 7 1	42 10 3	43 13 4	45 17 7	54 19 10	38 22 12	49 22 12	51 19 10	54 15 7	51 10 4	50 8 2
- █ Average max. and min. temperatures in °C
- █ Precipitation totals in mm
Imperial conversion
J	F	M	A	M	J	J	A	S	O	N	D
1.8 45 34	1.3 45 34	1.6 50 37	1.7 55 39	1.8 62 44	2.1 67 50	1.5 72 54	1.9 72 53	2 66 50	2.1 58 45	2 50 39	2 46 36
- █ Average max. and min. temperatures in °F
- █ Precipitation totals in inches
