= Robert Branford =

Robert Branford may refer to:

- Robert Branford (speedway rider) (born 1993), Australian speedway rider
- Robert Branford (police officer) (1820–1869), English police officer
