= Ebenezer Chapel, Heathfield =

Ebenezer Chapel
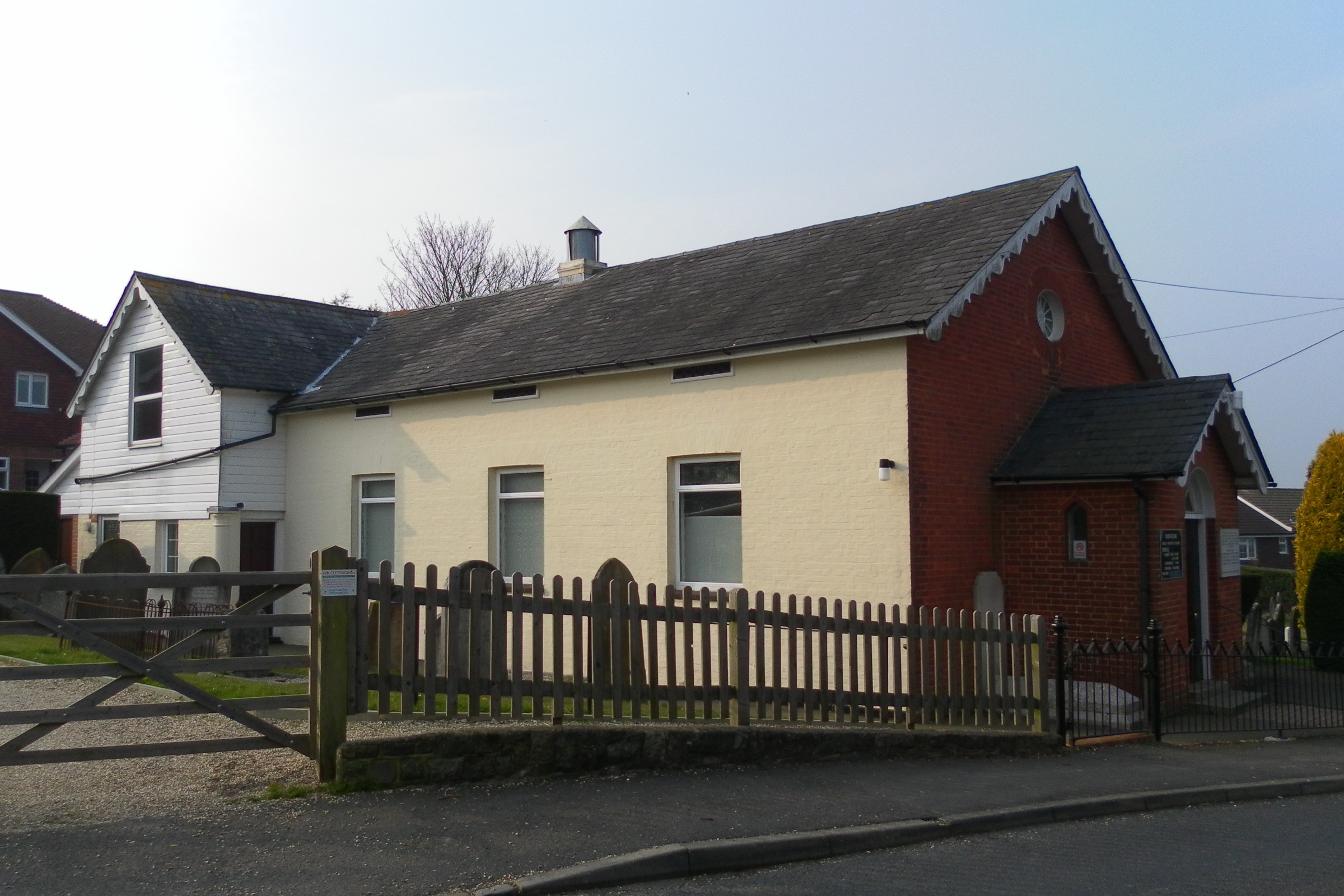
- The chapel
- Ebenezer Chapel
- 50.97836°N 0.28608°E
- Location: Broad Oak, Heathfield, East Sussex
- Country: England
- Denomination: Strict Baptist

History
- Status: Chapel
- Founded: 1864

Architecture
- Functional status: Active
- Style: Vernacular
- Completed: 1864

Ebenezer Chapel is a Strict Baptist place of worship in the hamlet of Broad Oak, part of the parish of Heathfield in the English county of East Sussex. The chapel was built in 1864.

An Independent Baptist congregation was founded here in 1835 by a Horsham-based preacher. The present chapel is aligned to the Gospel Standard movement and was built in 1864. It is timber-framed, partly weatherboarded and rendered, and has been extended several times. Above the entrance there is a gable.

The chapel is licensed for worship in accordance with the Places of Worship Registration Act 1855 and has the registration number 9014.

== See also ==
- List of current places of worship in Wealden
- List of Strict Baptist churches

== Bibliography ==
- Chambers, Ralph F. (1954). The Strict Baptist Chapels of England – Volume II: Sussex. Thornton Heath: Ralph F. Chambers.
- Stell, Christopher (2002). Nonconformist Chapels and Meeting-houses in Eastern England. Swindon: English Heritage. ISBN 1-873592-50-7.
