= Jireh Chapel, Haywards Heath =

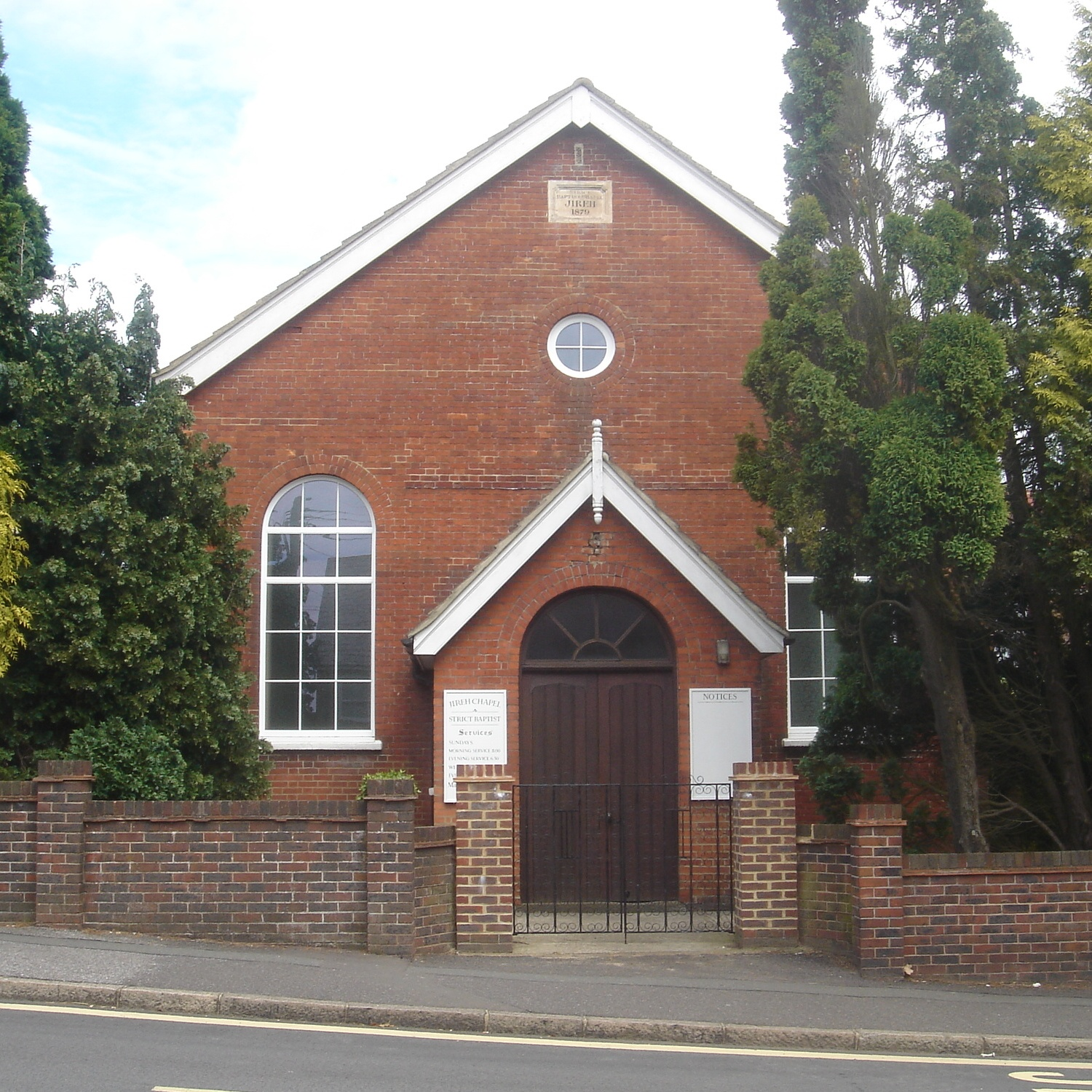
- The chapel
- Jireh Chapel, Haywards Heath
- 50.99329°N 0.09994°W
- Location: Haywards Heath
- Country: England
- Denomination: Gospel Standard Strict Baptist

History
- Status: Chapel
- Founded: 1879

Architecture
- Completed: 1879

The Jireh Chapel is a Strict Baptist place of worship in the town of Haywards Heath in the English county of West Sussex. The chapel was built in 1879.

Sussex has many 19th-century Independent and Baptist chapels in this Vernacular style: a tiled, gabled roof, porch, and red-brick walls with round-arched windows. This example was built in 1879 by William Knight, a horticulturist who was also the chapel's first pastor. It is a Gospel Standard movement chapel.

== See also ==
- List of places of worship in Mid Sussex
- List of Strict Baptist churches

== Bibliography ==
- Elleray, D. Robert (1981). The Victorian Churches of Sussex. Chichester: Phillimore & Co. Ltd. ISBN 0-85033-378-4.
- Ford, Wyn K.; Gabe, A. C. (1981). The Metropolis of Mid Sussex: a History of Haywards Heath. Haywards Heath: Charles Clarke (Haywards Heath) Ltd. ISBN 0-9502489-4-0.
