= Norwell Roberts =

British police constable (born 1946)

Norwell Roberts QPM
- Born: Norwell Lionel Gumbs; 23 October 1946 (age 79); Anguilla
- Police career
- Country: United Kingdom
- Department: Metropolitan Police Service
- Service years: 1967–1997
- Status: Retired
- Rank: Detective Sergeant
- Awards: Queen's Police Medal (1996)

Norwell Lionel Roberts QPM (né Gumbs; born 23 October 1946) is a British former police constable—the first black police officer to join London's Metropolitan Police. He eventually rose to the rank of Detective Sergeant. During his career, he was considered to be the first black police officer in the United Kingdom, although it has since been discovered that he had been preceded by Metropolitan Police Superintendent Robert Branford and Constable John Kent in Carlisle, both in the 19th century.

== Early life ==
Norwell Roberts was born Norwell Lionel Gumbs on 23 October 1946 in Anguilla, in the Leeward Islands in the West Indies.

His grandfather was a police sergeant, and three uncles were high-ranking officers, one of whom was awarded the Colonial Police Medal for his services. They all attended 12-week courses on the familiarisation of police procedure at Hendon Police College, where Roberts later trained.

His father died when he was three years old and his widowed mother, lured by promises of job opportunities and a better life, sailed for England in 1954. Roberts was left behind, to be raised by his strict preacher grandparents. His grandmother was a Methodist deaconess. When he misbehaved, he recalled with some horror, his grandmother would send him to the local shops wearing her dresses.

He arrived at the port of Dover at nine years old, when his mother secured employment as a housemaid in London. Roberts and his mother found life in England difficult, as with most post-war immigrants; securing housing was hard due to racial prejudices at the time. At home in Anguilla, Roberts' mother had run several neighbourhood shops but in London she took any domestic jobs she could get. Roberts and his mother eventually settled in Bromley, Kent.

In 1956, Roberts was the only Black child in his primary school, and when he passed the eleven-plus, the headmistress told his mother that Roberts would not be going to grammar school because he had to 'learn the English ways'. As a result, Norwell instead went to the local secondary modern school in Bromley, where the older sixth form students dropped him head first to the ground in order to see the colour of his blood. He still carries the scar on his forehead, but never once complained to his mother, because he understood that she had been powerless to act.

In 1959, his mother remarried and moved to Camden Town, North London, where Roberts went to Haverstock Hill Comprehensive School. He did not have a good relationship with his stepfather and he left his London home when he was just fifteen years old. Having passed O-Levels in Religious Knowledge and Chemistry, Roberts started work as a scientific laboratory technician in the Botany Department at Westfield College, University of London.

In 1966, while working at Westfield College, Roberts responded to a newspaper advertisement and completed the police recruitment application form. While on day release to Paddington Technical College, one of his fellow students who read the Daily Telegraph saw a headline which read ‘London to have first coloured Policeman soon’.

Roberts enlisted on 28 March 1967. This intake also included Paul Condon, now Baron Condon, who went on to become Metropolitan Police Commissioner.

After constant misspelling of the name "Gumbs", he changed his name in 1968 by deed poll, taking his mother's maiden name of Roberts.

== Police career ==
On 3 April 1967, when Roberts was 21, he officially joined the Metropolitan Police and achieved media and public attention because he was the first black police officer in the Met, which covers the Greater London area. At that time the only black people in uniform were working for London Transport on the buses or the underground and British Rail. Under the scrutiny of the popular press of the time, Roberts completed his initial training at Hendon Police College.

Roberts stated about his early years with the Met that, "nobody should be subject to that treatment, ever". He was initially stationed at Bow Street Police Station, in Covent Garden, London, where the first words his reporting sergeant said to him were, "look you nigger, I'll see to it that you never pass your probation". Police chiefs outwardly presented Roberts as an example of progressive policing, while Roberts faced racial abuse, harassment and persecution from his own colleagues. Colleagues that talked to him at work were ostracised, including some of those that trained with him, so would only speak to him at the section house. Roberts later claimed he would cope by weeping in the bath at the section house privately, since he feared showing weakness. He found the police station so hostile he would avoid eating with fellow officers, preferring to visit members of the community that invited him in for tea. One sunny afternoon outside the Royal Opera House the driver of a police car passing Roberts shouted, "black cunt" and drove on while other colleagues in the car laughed and Roberts stood embarrassed in front of members of the public. Roberts crossed the road into the police station opposite and reported the incident immediately to the Chief Superintendent who responded, "what do you want me to do about it?". This response left Roberts feeling he had lost his fight for acceptance, since it was his first complaint and all that had been acknowledged was his vulnerability. Roberts did not go to the press with his experiences at the time since he thought it wouldn't encourage others to join the police, though in an interview in 2020 he said, "what I regret most was that I'd like for someone who was about then, to come to me and say, "I know what it was like", you know, "I'm sorry about that". That's all. But they're always in denial."

He joined 'A' Relief and quickly became a popular member of the team due to his humour and dedication. He was disciplined verbally once for driving with fellow officers around the West End with a toilet roll hanging from the police van radio aerial.

As London's first black police officer, his career attracted significant media attention. Routine duties, such as patrolling his beat or policing protests in Trafalgar Square, were frequently covered by domestic and international newspapers. He was the subject of tabloid cartoons and appeared on the cover of Private Eye. His appointment was reported internationally, including in the Southern United States, where headlines referred to him as 'London's first negro cop'.

During Roberts' service, he policed anti-Vietnam War demonstrators paraded outside of the American Embassy. He was withdrawn from his post outside Rhodesia House after suffering abuse from anti-apartheid protesters who were protesting the hanging of three black Rhodesians. In 1969, Roberts was photographed linking arms with his colleagues during protests on the arrival of the South African rugby team at Twickenham.

Roberts transferred to CID at West End Central as a Temporary Detective Constable and later became a fully fledged Detective Constable in 1977 where he worked in the drugs squad and was occasionally seconded in undercover policing roles. Roberts was stationed at several police stations across London including Bow Street; Vine Street; West End Central; West Hampstead; Albany Street; Kentish Town; Acton; Ealing; Southall Ruislip; Wembley, Barnet; Borehamwood and Golders Green.

On his retirement in 1997, a leaving party was held at the banqueting rooms in Finchley. 600 people attended, including then Commissioner Paul Condon and his then-Chief Superintendent, Peter Twist.

== Personal life ==
Roberts has lived in Harrow with his wife Wendy since 1976. He is an active Freemason under the United Grand Lodge of England, initiated in 1985, and a member of Beauchamp Lodge No 1422 (West Kent) and Radlett Lodge No 6652 (Hertfordshire); he is also a member of the Holy Royal Arch and other Masonic orders.

== Honours and awards ==
Roberts received police commendations on three occasions, one of which was for his involvement in 1985 when he was part of a squad who arrested five people in six days for a contract killing. Metropolitan Police Commissioner, Sir Robert Mark praised Roberts' contribution towards better relations between white and black communities. In 1995, Roberts' was awarded the Queen's Police Medal for distinguished service. On 15 March 1996, Roberts attended Buckingham Palace where he was presented with the medal by King Charles III, then the Prince of Wales. During the presentation, he told Roberts that "We need more people like you." In the Summer of 2016 C. Hub Magazine decided to award Norwell Roberts with the highest category of the Creativity, Legend Award in recognition and honour of his selfless and long dedication to the safety of the Community and his determination to pave way for the next generation. The ceremony took place on the 16th of November 2016.

| Queens Police Medal | 1996 |
| Police Long Service and Good Conduct Medal | 1989 |

== See also ==
- Fay Allen - first black policewoman in UK
