= Jack Kent =

Jack Kent may refer to:

- Jack Kent (politician) (1870–1946), British politician with the Socialist Party of Great Britain
- Jack Kent (illustrator) (1920–1985), author-illustrator of children's books
- Jack Kent (footballer), 1891–1892 Everton player

== See also ==
- John Kent (disambiguation)
- Jonathan Kent (disambiguation)
- Jack o' Kent, an English folkloric character based in the Welsh Marches
- Jack Kent Cooke (1912–1997), Canadian-born American businessman involved in sports and broadcasting
