= Wattisham Strict Baptist Chapel =

Wattisham Baptist Chapel
- Wattisham Strict Baptist Chapel
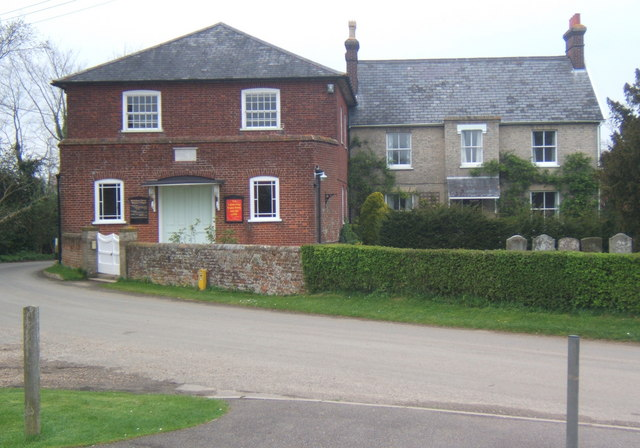
- The chapel seen from the west

- 52.1299°N 0.9351°E
- Location: Wattisham, Suffolk
- Country: England
- Denomination: Baptist
- Churchmanship: Strict Baptist
- Website: Wattisham Strict Baptist Chapel

History
- Status: chapel
- Founded: 1763

Architecture
- Functional status: Active
- Heritage designation: Grade II
- Designated: 10 July 1980
- Style: Vernacular
- Completed: 1825

Wattisham Strict Baptist Chapel is a Strict Baptist chapel in the village of Wattisham in Suffolk, England. It was built in 1825 and has been a Grade II listed building since 1980.

== History ==
The congregation was founded in 1763. Its first purpose-built chapel on this site was completed in the 1780s. It was replaced with the current brick building in 1825.

== See also ==
- List of Strict Baptist churches
