= Robert Branford (police officer) =

British police officer (1820–1869)

Superintendent Robert Branford
- Born: 6 May 1820; Stoke-by-Nayland, Suffolk, England
- Died: 14 August 1869 (aged 48); Little Waldingfield, Suffolk, England
- Occupation: Police officer
- Employer: Metropolitan Police
- Spouse: Sarah Honey (m. 1841)

Robert Branford (6 May 1820 – 14 August 1869) was a police officer in the Metropolitan Police in the 19th century. He is reputed to be the first black police officer in London.

== Biography ==
His mother was Hannah Branford, aged 18 and unmarried at the time of his birth. In later records, Branford listed his grandfather, Daniel Branford, as his stepfather. Little is known of Branford's biological father, but it is speculated that he was a merchant sailor or dockworker in Ipswich. He moved from Stoke to Valentine Place in Blackfriars, London, and joined the Metropolitan Police on 24 September 1838, at the recommendation of L Division Superintendent Grinsell, though his birthyear was falsely given as 1817. Branford's file listed his height as 5 ft 11 in (1.80 m), which was exceptionally tall for the era. Branford married his wife Sarah Honey, daughter of Arthur Honey from Borden, Kent, on 12 January 1841 at Trinity Church. The couple remained childless.

Branford was posted to Stone's End Police Station, near Borough High Street. He was promoted to Sergeant in 1846, and then inspector in 1851. By 1856 he was recorded as Superintendent of M Division, covering what is now Southwark. Branford was also commended for his performance by a magistrate at Southwark Court. Throughout his career, Branford moved to Weston Place, Bermondsey with his wife, later sharing a residence in Rotherhithe with another constable before relocating to Brunswick Street, Newington. In 1861, the parishioners of St Olave's Church, Southwark held a testimonial ceremony for Branford's command of police during the Great Fire of Tooley Street. He retired in 1866 and lived in Little Waldingfield, where he died of kidney failure in 1869. Branford's wife Hannah subsequently worked as a domestic servant until her death in 1881 and was buried next to her husband.

== Legacy ==
Branford was described, in the 1893 book "Scotland Yard, Past and Present", as “Not an educated man: but what to my idea was of much greater importance, he possessed a thorough knowledge of police matters in general. I should say he was about the only half-caste superintendent officer the Met ever had.” Until 2023, there were no known photographs of Branford.

Branford's biography was reconstructed in 2016 by historian Stephen Bourne, who had found a passing reference to Branford in the police history book The Great British Bobby by Clive Emsley. Bourne published his findings after watching the ITV documentary Inside Scotland Yard, when host Trevor McDonald described Norwell Roberts, who entered the service in 1966, as the Met's first black officer. Authors Keshia N. Abraham and John Woolf noted that outside of London, John Kent of Carlisle City Police, was appointed in 1835 while another man, Thomas Latham, is listed in Old Bailey records from 1746 as "Negro, Constable".
