= John Kent (hymnist) =

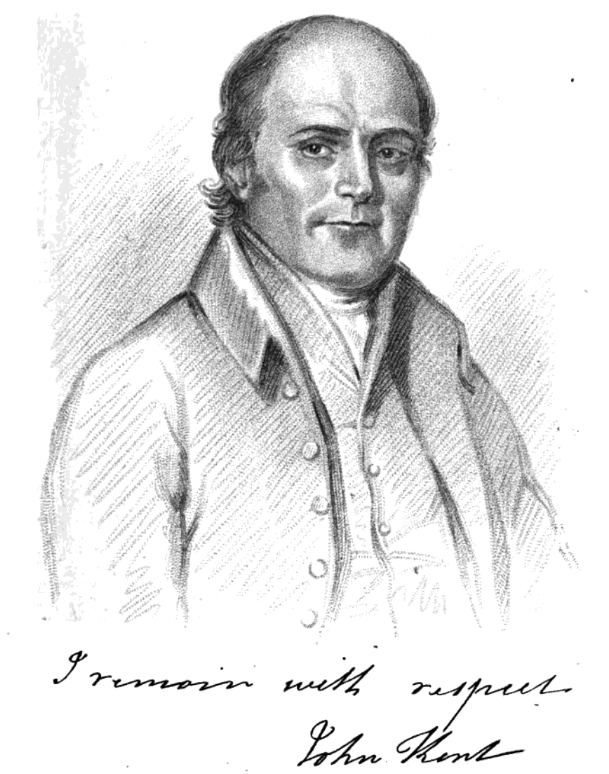
- John Kent
- Born: December 1766
- Died: 15 November 1843 (aged 76)
- Occupation: Hymnist

John Kent (December 1766 – 15 November 1843) was an English Calvinist Baptist writer of hymns.

== Biography ==
Kent was born of poor, religious parents in Devonshire, and was apprenticed to his father, a shipwright. He began to write verse in his youth, and worked hard to educate himself despite limited opportunities. His hymns are first known to have been published in 1799 in Samuel Reece's A Selection of Evangelical Hymns, compiled for the Barrack-Street Baptist congregation near Plymouth Dockyard, where he and his father worked. The first collection composed entirely of John Kent's hymns was his Original Gospel Hymns, published in 1803; though he gained a reputation as a hymnist, he continued as a shipbuilder, writing hymns as his work allowed. His collection passed through ten editions between 1803 and 1861, being expanded with new material as it became available. Kent became blind by 60 years of age, and mostly ceased authoring new hymns until his death seventeen years later in 1843. His last words were "I am accepted."

== Character of his works ==
The simplicity and force of Kent's hymns' expression of Calvinism has limited their adoption outside a narrow segment of Christian churches, but they have been fairly broadly employed in various Predestinarian Baptist churches, with 51 of them contained in William Gadsby's A Selection of Hymns for Public Worship and twelve in Charles Spurgeon's Our Own Hymn Book. His most frequently-printed hymns include "What Cheering Words Are These", "O Thou, Before Whose Gracious Throne", "On Zion's Glorious Summit Stood", and "Where Two or Three Together Meet".
