= Jonathan Kent =

Jonathan or Jon Kent may refer to:

- Jonathan Kent (director) (born 1949), British theatre and opera director
- Jonathan Kent (cricketer) (born 1973), English cricketer
- Jon Kent (cricketer) (born 1979), South African cricketer

== Comics ==
- Jonathan and Martha Kent, DC Comics characters, Superman's adoptive parents
- Jon Kent (DC Comics), the son of Superman in various stories and the Superboy in DC Comics such as Convergence, Superman: Lois and Clark, and DC Rebirth
- Jon Lane Kent, son of Superman and Lois Lane from an alternate future in the Superboy comics
- Jonathan Kent, alias of Lar Gand a.k.a. Mon-El in the Superman comics

== See also ==
- John Kent (disambiguation)
- Jack Kent (disambiguation)
