= William Gadsby =

British pastor and hymnwriter

Pastor William Gadsby
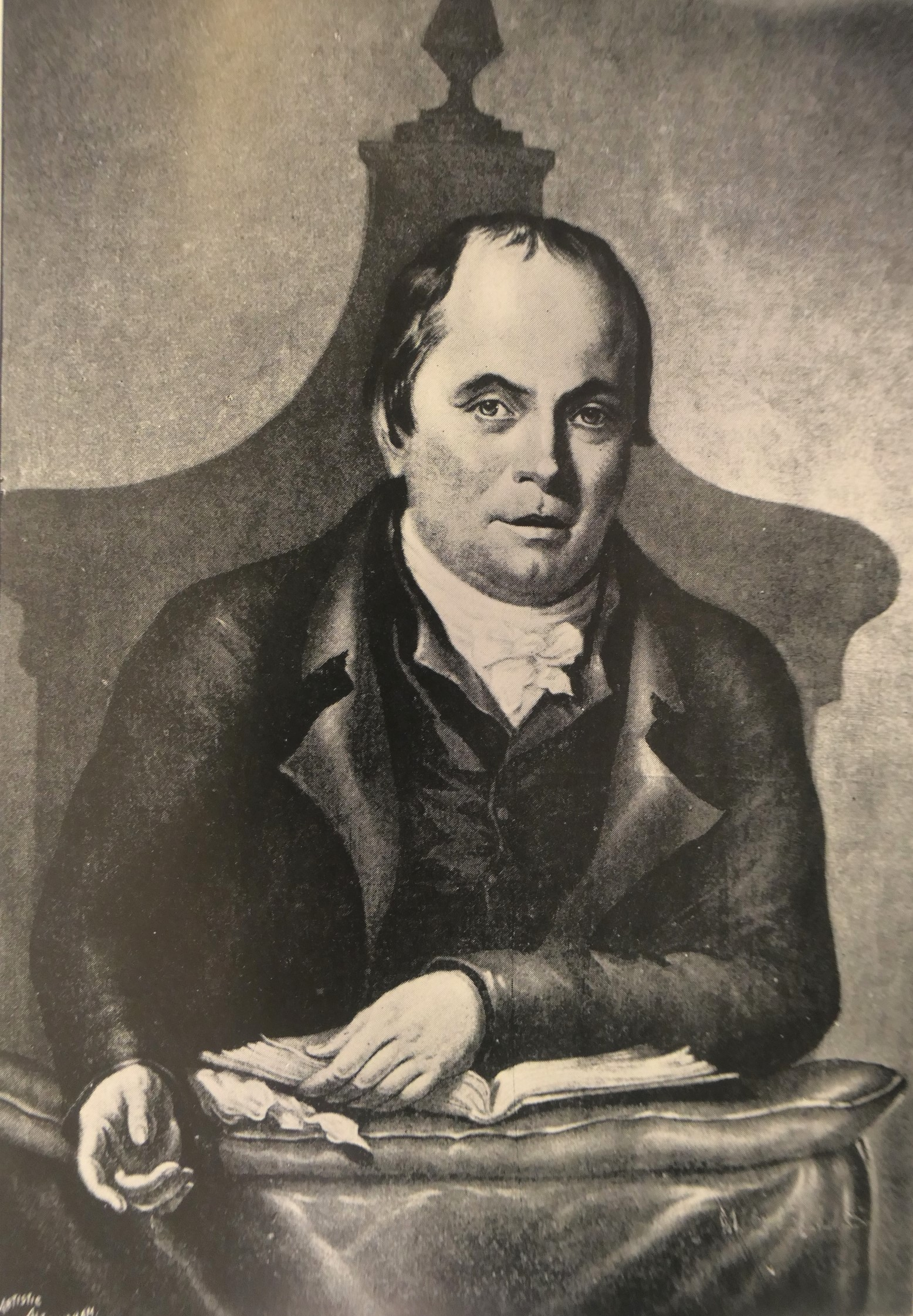
- Born: 3 January 1773; Attleborough, Warwickshire
- Died: 27 January 1844 (aged 71); Manchester, England
- Occupations: Pastor, Church planter
- Theological work
- Era: Late 18th Century
- Tradition or movement: Strict Baptism; Christian Socialism

William Gadsby (1773–1844) was an English Strict Baptist pastor, hymn writer and church planter. He is often seen of a father of the Strict and Particular Baptist movement in England. Although he was not formally educated, Gadsby was regarded by his contemporaries as an excellent preacher and pastor who championed the cause of social justice and opposed the established Elizabethan Church.

Originally pastoring in Leicestershire, in October 1805 he left to become pastor of Black Lane Strict and Particular Baptist Chapel in Manchester, England, and held that position until he died. Due to reconstructions and changes in street names, that same congregation was variously known as St George's Road Baptist Chapel, and Rochdale Road Particular Baptist Chapel.

== Early life ==
William was just one of fourteen children born to John and Martha Gadsby at Attleborough, Warwickshire on or around 3 January 1773. He was born into poverty and only briefly attended Nuneaton church school, starting work as a ribbon weaver at age 13. Being older than most of his siblings, he often had to care for them and this taught him the importance of leadership. By age 17 he had forgotten how to read.

His conversion to Christianity was also at this age: "But when the Lord was graciously pleased to quicken my soul, being then just 17 years of age, and showed me something of what sin really was, I really feared it then, and a turn in my mind took place of a very different kind... I was then solemnly and blessedly led to believe in God's free mercy and pardon." After this, he briefly attended an Independent Chapel in nearby Bedworth, however after meeting Pastor John Butterworth and conversing about the point of believer's baptism, he joined the Cow Lane Baptist Church in Coventry where he was baptized the same day on 29 December 1793.

== Ministry in Leicestershire ==
The Barn at Hinckley

Despite his impoverished upbringing and his strong belief that this should prevent him from preaching, William Gadsby felt called to form his own church in an old barn at the town of Hinckley.

Because of his lower-class background, as well as his opposition to the Church of England, he faced much opposition. This included an attempted assassination, when he was stoned by thugs through a hole in the roof of the barn. When members of his congregation attempted to chase after them, he commanded them saying "God will see to it that I am not hurt".

The Church of Desford

He also began preaching to a small chapel in the village of Desford from 1794. This congregation had a proper church but was very poor. Thanks to donations from his loyal congregation, he began to sell drapery goods from land he bought in Hinckley as well as building a house.

Hinckley Ebenezer Chapel

In 1802, Gadsby and his flock began constructing a new independent chapel known as Hinckley Chapel. It was a difficult project due to the poverty of his congregation, and they were often mocked by locals. Gadsby preached here until he moved to preach in Manchester in 1805.

His experiences here would influence his future theology and politics, especially his political views.

== Ministry in Manchester ==
Gadsby originally had no intention of moving to Manchester, however after learning that there was a chapel called "Back Lane Particular Baptist Chapel" that was without a pastor, he requested that he be allowed to preach there for a month as he attended to "business". He did not initially state it out of embarrassment but he did not have any business in Manchester but he had heard the people of Manchester were very charitable and so he sought to beg for money as his funds for Hinckley Chapel were dangerously low.

Eventually his sermons were admired by the congregation at Manchester and in 1805, he decided to settle there and become pastor for this chapel.

This event not only coincided with Britain's victory at Trafalgar, but also the start of much social discontent in Manchester, of which Gadsby would play a large role.

38 Year Ministry

Back Lane Particular Baptist Chapel would later be renamed to Rochdale Road Chapel and not long after becoming pastor, Gadsby managed to attract an even larger congregation.

As well as this, he often travelled on foot across much of Northern England, spreading the gospel, generally to the poor and working class, as well as starting more than 40 new Strict and Particular Baptist Chapels.

Along with his son, John, in 1835 he founded the Gospel Standard magazine, which is now the longest running religious magazine in England.

== Peterloo Massacre ==
Just as many other dissident Protestant groups at the time as well as earlier, Gadsby's ministry showed a deep concern for the issues of social injustice and laissez faire economics. His political ideas also came from his family’s poverty when he was growing up and the perceived bourgeois attitude of the established Elizabethan Church.

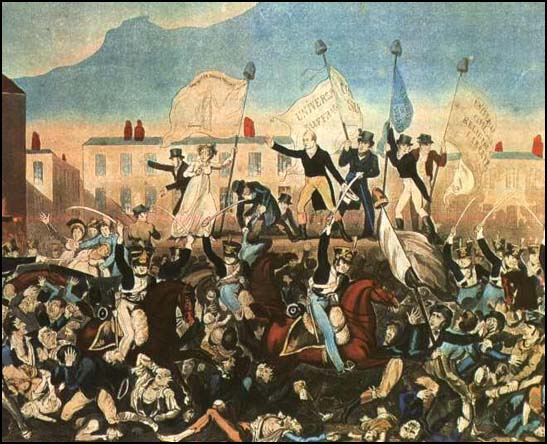
Painting of protesters being attacked by soldiers during the Peterloo Massacre

After the massacre of protesting workers by the cavalry on 16 August 1819, known as the Peterloo Massacre, Gadsby joined with many other political agitators in signing a "Declaration and Protest". In a letter to a friend in London, he wrote "I can assure you there is little else in our town but tyranny and oppression".

It was this sense of social injustice that caused him to be involved in the Anti-Corn Law League.

He often enraged upper class circles for bringing his radical politics into his sermons, however he was often praised by his working class congregation. On one occasion, he claimed in a speech that the mantra of landlordism was "the labouring, the industrious people of England shall not partake of the fruit of the earth, if we can help it, for we are determined to keep the greatest part for ourselves". When he attempted to continue, he was drowned out by the cheers of the crowd. When he apologised for detaining them for so long there were cries of "go on".

== Theology ==
The theology of William Gadsby has been a cause of much debate, even during his own life. During his life, critics called him both a Hyper-Calvinist and an Antinomian. Because of this variety of theological labels, it has become increasingly difficult to pin-point his exact theological doctrine.

Christology

Gadsby's Selection of Hymns for Public Worship is entirely trinitarian in nature, and in many hymns an emphasis on the divinity of Jesus is evident. (Note: See Hymns 525, 543, 831, 905)

Gadsby had an orthodox view of the nature of Christ. For example, in his sermon, 'God in our nature', he states: "This blessed Redeemer, this Person of the Son, takes our nature, and is “God with us.” I believe that our blessed Christ really took soul and body, the whole of humanity. He was “God with us” in his weakness; “God with us” in his conflicts; “God with us” in his victories."

He taught the utmost primacy of the first coming of Jesus in the bible, believing the Incarnation was what the Old Testament led to and the New Testament continued from. B.A. Ramsbottom, the author of the most extensive biography of Gadsby, and a Gospel Standard Baptist pastor writes that "the gospel contains all that is included in the law, but is a much higher standard".

Soteriology

Gadsby was a Calvinist. He rejected both paedobaptism and the necessity of baptism for salvation. He also believed in only two sacraments, Baptism followed by the Lord's Supper. According to Strict Baptist Theology, one could not partake in the remembrance of the Lord's Supper unless they had been baptised, a doctrine known as Closed Communion.

His major theological rival within the Reformed Baptists was the preacher, Andrew Fuller, who believed in the ability of the visible Church to make free offers of grace to all people. Gadsby argued that the duty of the Church was not to offer the gospel to people, but to preach the gospel to all people and allow God to offer grace.

Evangelism

The Strict Baptists were sometimes labelled Antinomians in their early years due to their belief in the gospel as the believers rule of conduct. fGadsby's followers were encouraged to only buy and sell from other Strict Baptists.Following his death and a slow decline in the denomination's size, this practice slowly died out, but the practice of being independent from the outside world remained in their evangelism which caused them to be labelled Hyper-Calvinists, even in modern times.

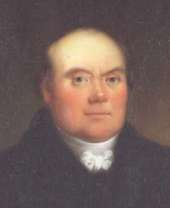
William Gadsby's portrait

Gadsby's popularity has caused him to be described as the ‘most effective post-war Baptist politician’. He modelled his preaching after Paul the Apostle's methods, writing letters, planting churches and embarking on missionary journeys across northern England, this spread both his theological ideas as well as his political radicalism.

Political views and activism

William Gadsby was a renowned political radical and a fiery opponent to what he perceived as the bourgeois attitude of the established Churches and the monarchy, and this caused him to become much despised in upper-class circles but much beloved amongst the workers. He is also thought to have had sympathy for the oath-based association of the Luddites, due to his opposition to industrialisation.

His political engagement has been thought to embarrass later Strict Baptists as his son eliminated most political references from his published Works in 1851. His son, John also rebuked his followers for wrongfully claiming that William supported violent revolution. William Tant, a follower of John Gadsby, condemned another of his followers, Edmund Greenfield, when the latter wrote an article calling for Strict Baptists to become the "forces of Abaddon" mentioned in Revelation 9.

== Death and legacy ==
Gadsby died of a lung infection on 27 January 1844, two weeks after turning 71.

Shortly before his death he quoted an early expression where he said "in heaven we shall all have immortal lungs".

According to B.A. Ramsbottom, the morning of his funeral saw thousands of people lining the streets to pay homage to him. His funeral was taken by John Kershaw, who preached from the first Epistle of Peter and stated that Gadsby was now "crowning the Redeemer's brow with immortal honours", a nod to William's famous hymn, "Immortal Honours Rest on Jesus' Head".

He is a well remembered figure in the SB community and his Hymnal remains in use within Gospel Standard churches.

== See also ==
- A Selection of Hymns for Public Worship
- Gospel Standard
- Reformed Baptists
- List of Strict Baptist churches
