= Fay Allen =

British police constable (1938–2021)

- Allen in 1968
- Born: Sislin Fay Patterson; 29 March 1938; Saint Catherine Parish, Colony of Jamaica
- Died: 4 July 2021 (aged 83); Ocho Rios, Saint Ann Parish, Jamaica
- Known for: First black woman police constable in the United Kingdom
- Police career
- Department: Metropolitan Police; Jamaica Constabulary Force
- Branch: Missing Persons Bureau
- Service years: 1968–1972 (Met); 1972–? (JCF)
- Status: Retired
- Awards: Lifetime achievement award

Sislin Fay Allen (née Patterson; 20 March 1938 – 4 July 2021), known as Fay Allen, was a British and Jamaican police officer who was the first black woman police constable in the United Kingdom, serving in the Metropolitan Police in London from 1968 to 1972. She also worked for the Jamaica Constabulary Force.

== Early life and family ==
Allen was born in Saint Catherine Parish, Jamaica, as the youngest of ten children to Frances (née Ogilve) and Ebenezer Patterson. Her mother died when Allen was 13, after which she was raised by her aunt, who was a judge. She left school to care for her ill father, who died in 1962.

Allen moved to the United Kingdom in 1961 or 1962. She lived in Thornton Heath, Croydon. She qualified as a State enrolled nurse in October 1963, having trained at Queen's Hospital, Croydon with placements at the Purley War Memorial Hospital and Waddon Hospital, Croydon. She then worked at Queen's Hospital, Croydon, a geriatric facility in south London. She was married to a fellow Jamaican immigrant and had two children.

== Career ==
Allen had always been interested in the police and in 1968 saw a recruitment advertisement in the newspaper, applied, and was selected. The first black officer in the British police since the 19th century, Norwell Roberts, had only joined the Metropolitan Police the previous year. "On the day I joined I nearly broke a leg trying to run away from reporters," she told an interviewer later. "I realised then that I was a history maker. But I didn't set out to make history; I just wanted a change of direction."

After training at Peel House for 13 weeks, she was posted to Fell Road police station in Croydon, where she lived, on 29 April 1968, aged 29. She experienced more prejudice from the black community than from her colleagues or from white people in Croydon, and was met largely with curiosity and considerable interest from the media, although the Metropolitan Police did receive some racist mail about her appointment. The threatening and abusive letters she received when she started working at Fell Road made her consider whether she wanted to remain in the force. After a year in Croydon, she was posted to the Missing Persons Bureau at Scotland Yard for a while before being transferred back to the beat at Norbury police station.

== Later years ==
In 1972, she resigned from the Metropolitan Police to return to Jamaica with her family. There she joined the Jamaica Constabulary Force. Eventually, she returned to England; as of 2015, she lived in South London. In 2020, she was given a lifetime achievement award by the National Black Police Association.

She died in Ocho Rios, Jamaica, on 4 July 2021, aged 83. Her death was announced the following day.

== Legacy ==
Allen has been an inspiration to women wanting to join the police and especially for black women police officers such as Commander Alison Heydari.
