= John Butterworth (minister) =

English Baptist minister (1727–1803)

John Butterworth (1727 – 1803) was an English Baptist minister.

== Life ==
John Butterworth was born on 13 December 1727, one of the five sons of Henry Butterworth, a blacksmith of Goodshaw and Baptist deacon in Cloughfold. He studied at the school of David Crosley, a Calvinist Baptist minister. Three of his brothers also became Baptist ministers: Henry was at Bridgnorth; James was at Bromsgrove; and Lawrence, who wrote two pamphlets against Unitarianism, was at Evesham. The other brother, Thomas, was also involved as a supply preacher.

In 1753, Butterworth was ordained pastor of Cow Lane Chapel (presently Queens Road Baptist Church), in Coventry. He ministered in the church for half a century, dying on 24 April 1803, at the age of 75.

== Works ==
Butterworth published, in 1767, A New Concordance and Dictionary to the Holy Scriptures, reprinted in 1785, 1792, and 1809. The last edition was edited by Adam Clarke. The Encyclopædia Metropolitana considered it "for the most part, a judicious abridgment" of Cruden's Concordance.

He also wrote A Serious Address to the Rev. Dr. Priestley, 1790. This was published under the pseudonym "Christophilus", and attacked the Unitarian views of Joseph Priestley.

== Family ==
His son Joseph Butterworth is known as a publisher.

== Notes ==
Attribution

This article incorporates text from a publication now in the public domain: Stephen, Leslie, ed. (1886). "Butterworth, John". Dictionary of National Biography. Vol. 8. London: Smith, Elder & Co.
