= Walter Gale (schoolmaster) =

Walter Gale was the first schoolmaster of the Mayfield Charity School in Mayfield, East Sussex, now the Mayfield Church of England Primary School, serving from 1750 until 1771. Gale's diaries, which have been used by a number of historians to describe the nature of the English countryside, English schooling and even the social status of tobacco smoking, describe the life of an educated man spending his time drinking, smoking, attending church and reading books. It also describes odd bits of labour engaged in by Gale, including marking fabrics (quilts, and at one point a waistcoat) and agreeing to paint an illustration of the Ten Commandments at a church for two guineas.

== Discovery of the diaries and posthumous publication ==
The diaries were discovered by the mayor of Hastings in the 1850s who saved them from being set alight. After being edited by Robert Willis Blencowe (1791-1874), they were published in 1857 by the Sussex Archaeological Society.

== Editorial notes ==
Blencowe's editorial describes a variety of events alluded to by Gale. For instance, Gale makes reference to the confiscation of a horse carrying bottles of (presumably illegally smuggled) brandy, and Blencowe describes some of the history of smuggling in Kent and Sussex. Entries after 1752 are lost, and Blencowe notes how "it was probably very voluminous, for he held his place till 1771". Blencowe's extracts are completed by noting the reasons for Gale's departure from the school:

That the schoolmaster, Walter Gale, be removed from the school for neglecting the duties thereof, and that he have notice to leave the same the next quarter-day.

In 1772, the parish agreed to cease paying Gale the salary he was due "till he has absolutely put the schoolhouse in such a condition as to the form of it as it was at the time of his entering upon such house". Records note that the next schoolmaster was named T. Weller.
