= Queens Road Baptist Church, Coventry =

Baptist church in Coventry, England

Coordinates: 52°24′14.6″N 1°31′0.9″W

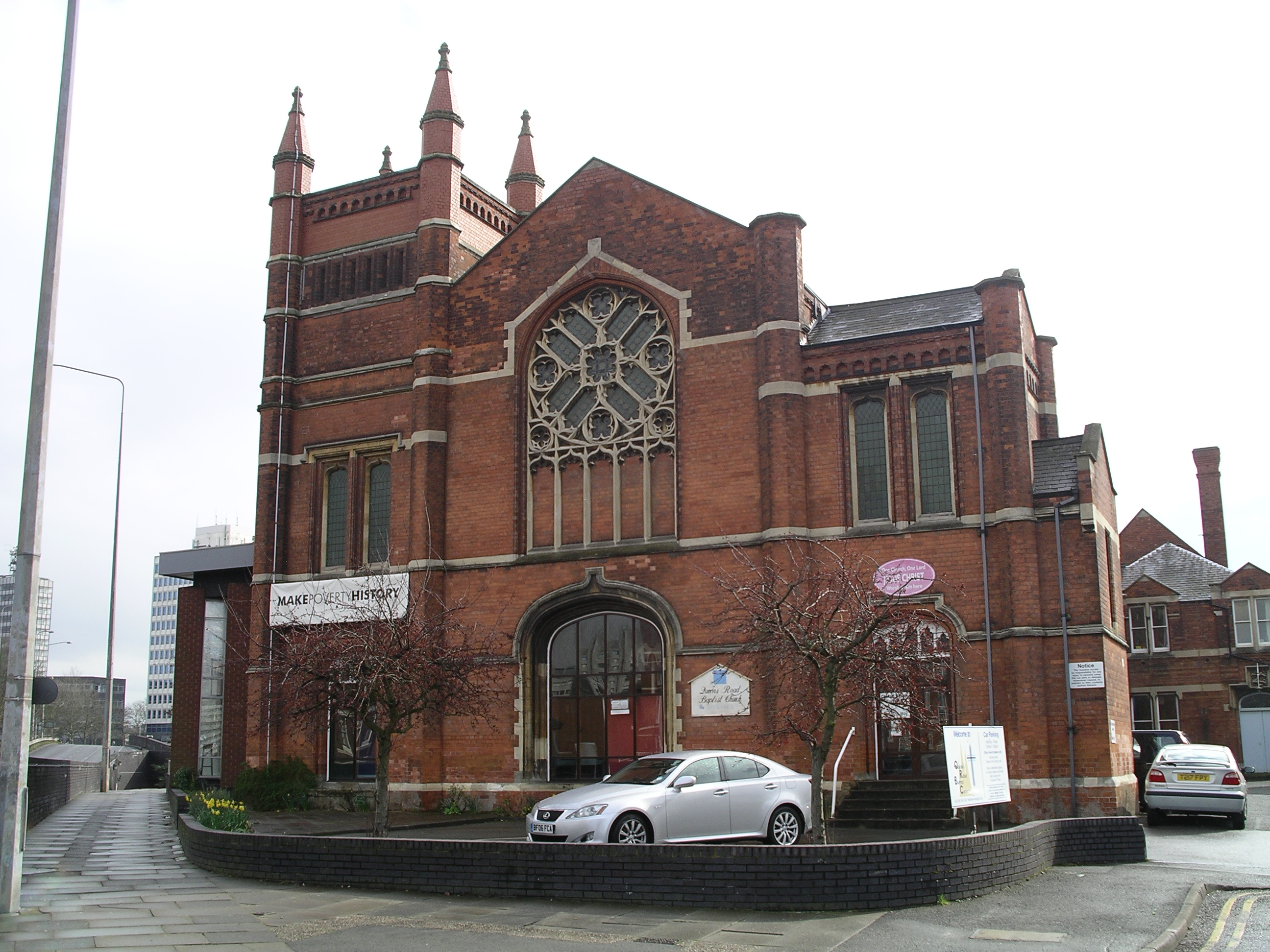
Queens Road Baptist Church

Queens Road Baptist Church is a Baptist church in the city center of Coventry, England, United Kingdom. The chapel is a grade II listed building.

== History ==
The church has a continuous history traced back to 1643. In that year, a number of issues arose in the two parish churches of Coventry surrounding church style, personal faith, and baptism, seeking for religious purity. From this, a distinct Baptist church arose, worshipping in private property.

In 1723, the first chapel was erected for the church. During John Butterworth ministry, the church developed and grew, until it moved into a larger premises in Cow Lane.

In 1884, the minister William Henderson moved the church to the current chapel in Queens Road. John Worwood, a deacon at the time, owned a carpentry and a building business and was the builder of the church as appointed by the Building Committee in February 1882 to build it on commission.

In 1931, Howard Ingli James, a new prominent minister, was ordained at the church. He greatly influenced the people of Coventry with his political campaign for social justice and welfare. He renounced war and was the reason behind many members of Queens Road became conscientious objectors during the War.

In the 1970s, the church had its most dynamic minister in, JP. Richard Hamper. With his wife Madeline, they sought to encourage youth inclusion in the church life, whilst enabling a strong understanding of the Christian message. His role as a JP was driven by a sense of social justice without prejudice.

The church changed again after 1980 whilst David Spriggs was minister. He began various Evangelical programmes with the co-operation of other various churches within the area. In 2007, Grenville Overton was minister. During his ministry, he oversaw the extension and refurbishment of the church.
