= Mayfield and Five Ashes =

Parish in East Sussex, England

Coordinates: 51.02°N 0.26°E

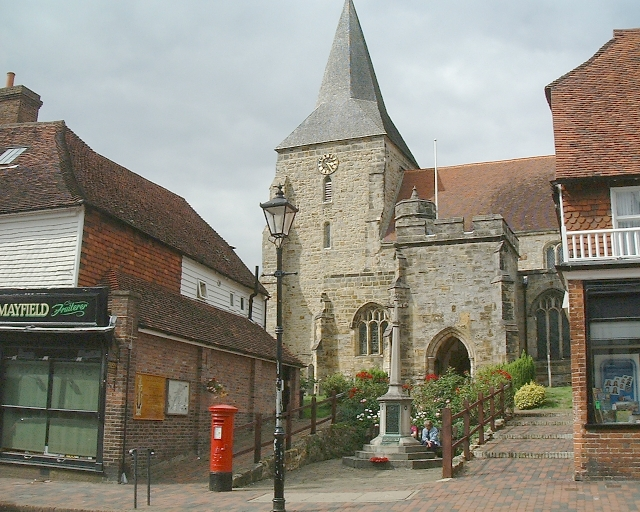
- St Dunstan's Church, Mayfield

- Location within East Sussex
- Area: 42.4 km^{2} (16.4 sq mi)
- Population: 4,049 (2021 Census)
  - Density: 218/sq mi (84/km^{2})
- OS grid reference: TQ585269
  - London: 37 miles (60 km) NNW
- District: Wealden
- Shire county: East Sussex
- Region: South East
- Country: England
- Sovereign state: United Kingdom
- Post town: MAYFIELD
- Postcode district: TN20
- Dialling code: 01435
- Police: Sussex
- Fire: East Sussex
- Ambulance: South East Coast
- UK Parliament: Wealden; Bexhill and Battle
- Website: Parish Council

Mayfield and Five Ashes is a civil parish in the High Weald of East Sussex, England. The two villages making up the principal part of the parish lie on the A267 road between Royal Tunbridge Wells and Eastbourne: Mayfield, the larger, is ten miles (16 km) south of Royal Tunbridge Wells; with Five Ashes being 2.5 miles (4.0 km) further south. On 1 April 1999 the parish was renamed from "Mayfield" to "Mayfield and Five Ashes".

== Mayfield village ==
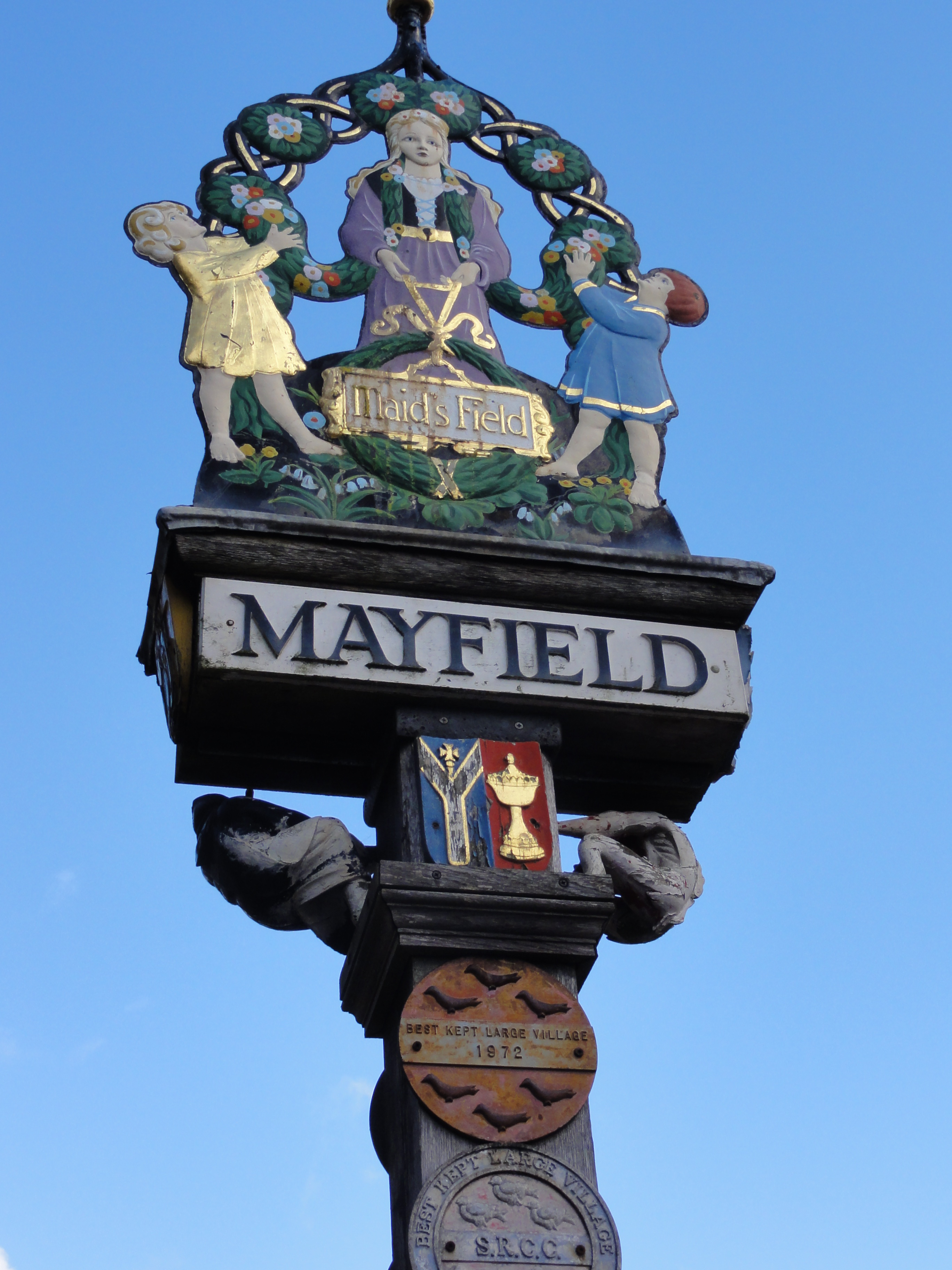
Mayfield village sign

Every September the village hosts its annual carnival. This is to commemorate the four Protestants who were executed here on 24 September 1556, burnt at the stake on ground opposite what is now Colkins Mill Church in Station Road. They are also commemorated in Lewes. The carnival event is part of the Sussex bonfire tradition of marking the execution of Protestants by Queen (Bloody) Mary, and later, the discovery of the Catholic Gunpowder Plot. The processions march through the village by torchlight on the third Saturday in September, ending with a bonfire and firework display in the recreation ground. Four burning crosses are carried in the processions in memory of the four people who were martyred in 1556. The money raised through the street collection is donated to local charities.

Mayfield was a centre of the Wealden ironworking industry.

The village is also known for its biennial festival of music and the arts, held in even-numbered years. Having been founded in 1970, the Mayfield Festival predominantly features the performance of classical music.

== Governance ==
Mayfield and Five Ashes Civil Parish falls within the electoral ward of the same name. The population of this ward at the 2021 Census was 3,654.

=== Toponymy ===
The early village was recorded in the Domesday Book of 1086 within the Rape of Pevensey as Mesewelle, which may indicate a well on tableland or more likely "belonging to Meese", a Norman man's name, or less likely, a new well or well dedicated to the Virgin Mary. The meshing of Norman French and Anglo-Saxon into Middle English meant that one person was often referred to by several spellings in a lifetime. Various spellings of Meese include Meece, Mese, Mece, Mees, Mey, and May.

The village name derives from both "Maghefeld" (a field where mayweed grows) and "maid's field" – the village sign depicts a maid. A number of 17th-century emigrants to the New World had the surname May rather than Maid, which indicates the Middle English "mayde" in signage began as a rebus. Mayfield used to be a part of the manor of Malling, to the north west of Lewes, which belonged to the Kings of Wessex. Between 823 and 836 AD, King Egbert of Wessex and his son Æthelwulf gave it to Canterbury Cathedral: it became an Archbishop's 'peculiar' in the Diocese of Canterbury, and one of the Archbishop's palaces was built here. It was transferred to the Diocese of Chichester in 1846.

=== 16th and 17th centuries ===
Mayfield was at its height during the boom in the Wealden iron industry, and many of the fine houses date from that time.

=== 18th and 19th centuries ===
During the early 18th century, Mayfield became a centre for owling - smuggling wool in exchange for brandy and silk. Gabriel Tomkins was the leader of the local gang: in 1721 he was chased from Burwash to Nutley and then was arrested. The gang had a reputation for not using violence; and also applying their profits to the benefit of the local community, unlike many other such gangs: the Hawkhurst Gang in particular.

The Swing Riots affected the area with army arriving on 15 November 1830. Some local workers were imprisoned or transported.

With the opening of the railway line in 1880 between Hailsham and Tunbridge Wells a railway station was built to serve the village. On 1 September 1897, there was a railway accident on a curved section of track between Heathfield and Mayfield near Clayton Farm. A six-carriage train pulled by the engine Bonchurch was derailed and the driver was killed. The station closed in 1965 following the Beeching Report. The station building in Station Road is now converted to a private house and the route of the railway is now occupied by the re-routed A267 bypass of the village.

=== Mayfield churches ===
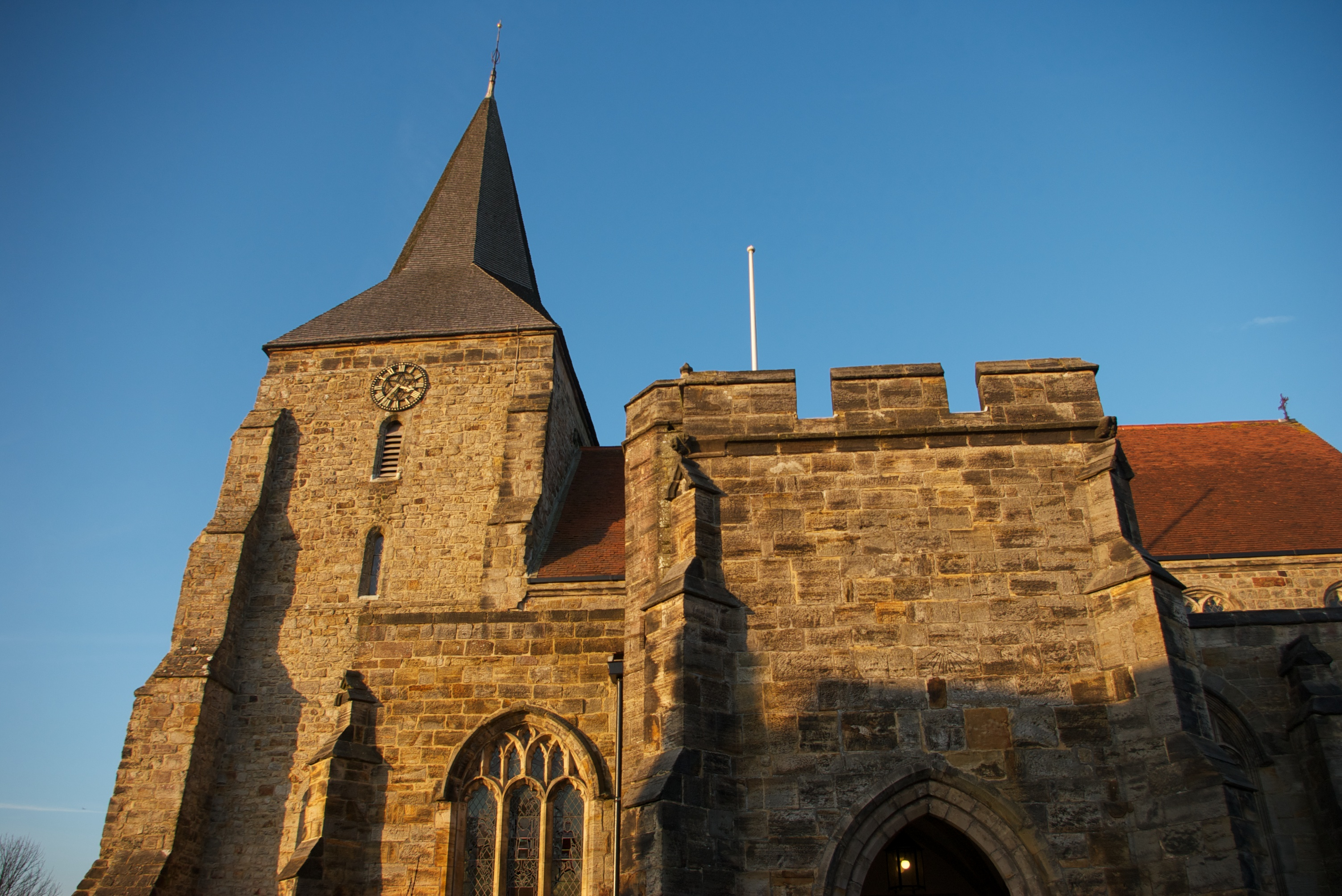
St Dunstan's Church

Both village and church are said to have been founded by the Archbishop of Canterbury, St Dunstan, in 960 CE, and there are legends surrounding his connection with the village. Dunstan is supposed to have become an ironworker and run a small forge next to the church. The legend goes that he was confronted by the devil, either making offensive remarks, or disguised as a young woman. He pinched the devil's nose with the tongs; the devil then fled to Tunbridge Wells and doused his burnt nose with the spring water. Some sources say that the story happened in Glastonbury rather than Mayfield, and that Dunstan may have in fact clamped tongs around someone's nose, with the story of it being the devil added later.

The Anglican church is dedicated to Dunstan. In 1389 much of the village and most of the church were destroyed by fire; the latter was struck by lightning in the 17th century. The church was subsequently rebuilt in the fifteenth century. The church is in a mostly Perpendicular style and has a "squat, shingled broach spire". Inside the church there are a number of graves made of iron for the families of Mayfield's ironmasters.

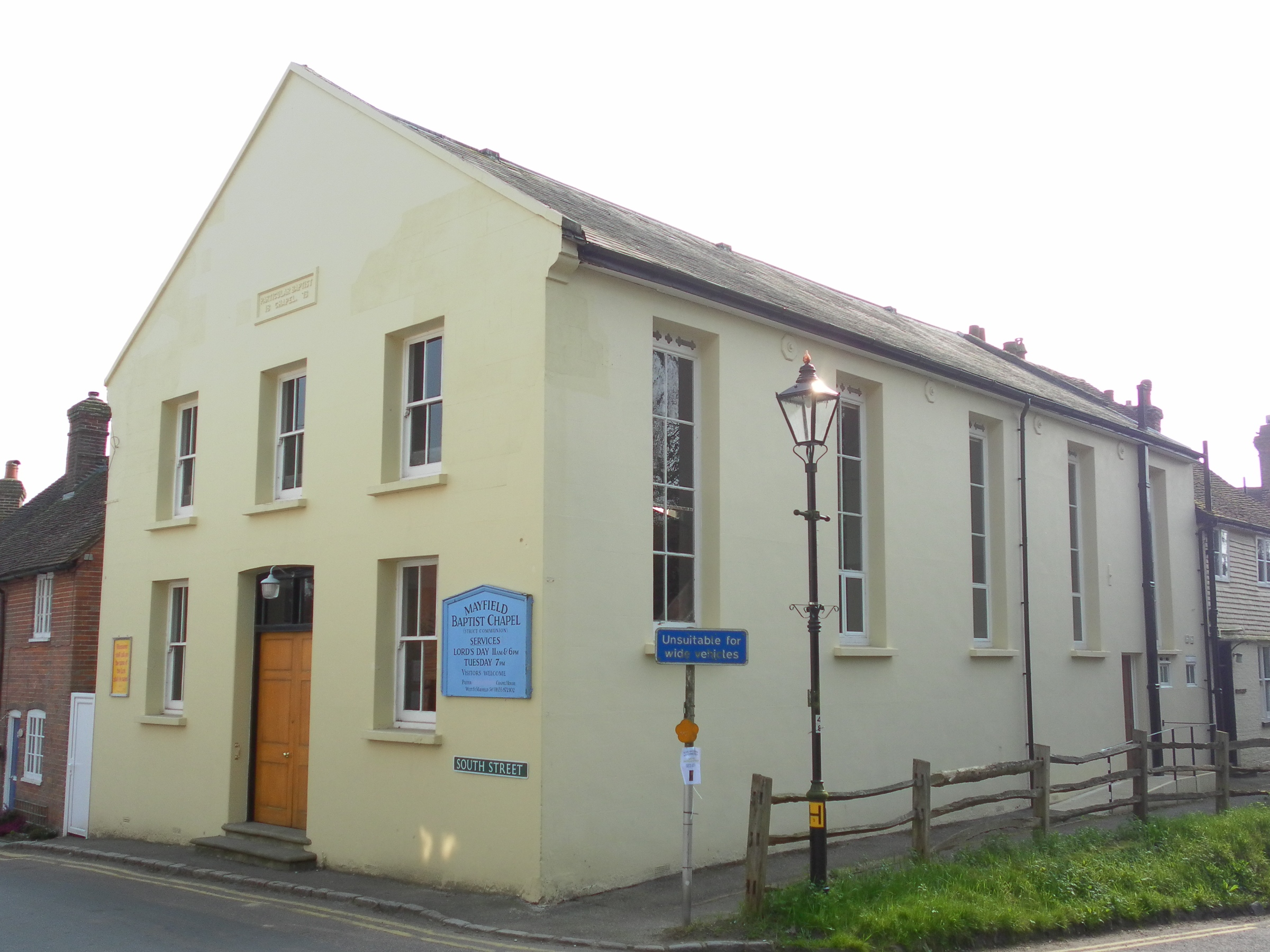
Mayfield Baptist Chapel

There are three other religious buildings in Mayfield: the Roman Catholic church of St Thomas of Canterbury (in Station Road), Colkins Mill Church (a Free Church, also in Station Road), and Mayfield Baptist Chapel (on South Street).

=== Shops and businesses ===
There are a large number of shops and other commercial properties in Mayfield High Street.

There are two pubs in Mayfield: the Middle House (in the High Street) and the Rose and Crown (in Fletching Street).

The multi-award-winning retreat venue, Fair Oak Farm, often frequented by celebrities and hired by internationally recognised brands, is located on Witherenden Road, a country lane just outside of the village.

=== Mayfield schools ===
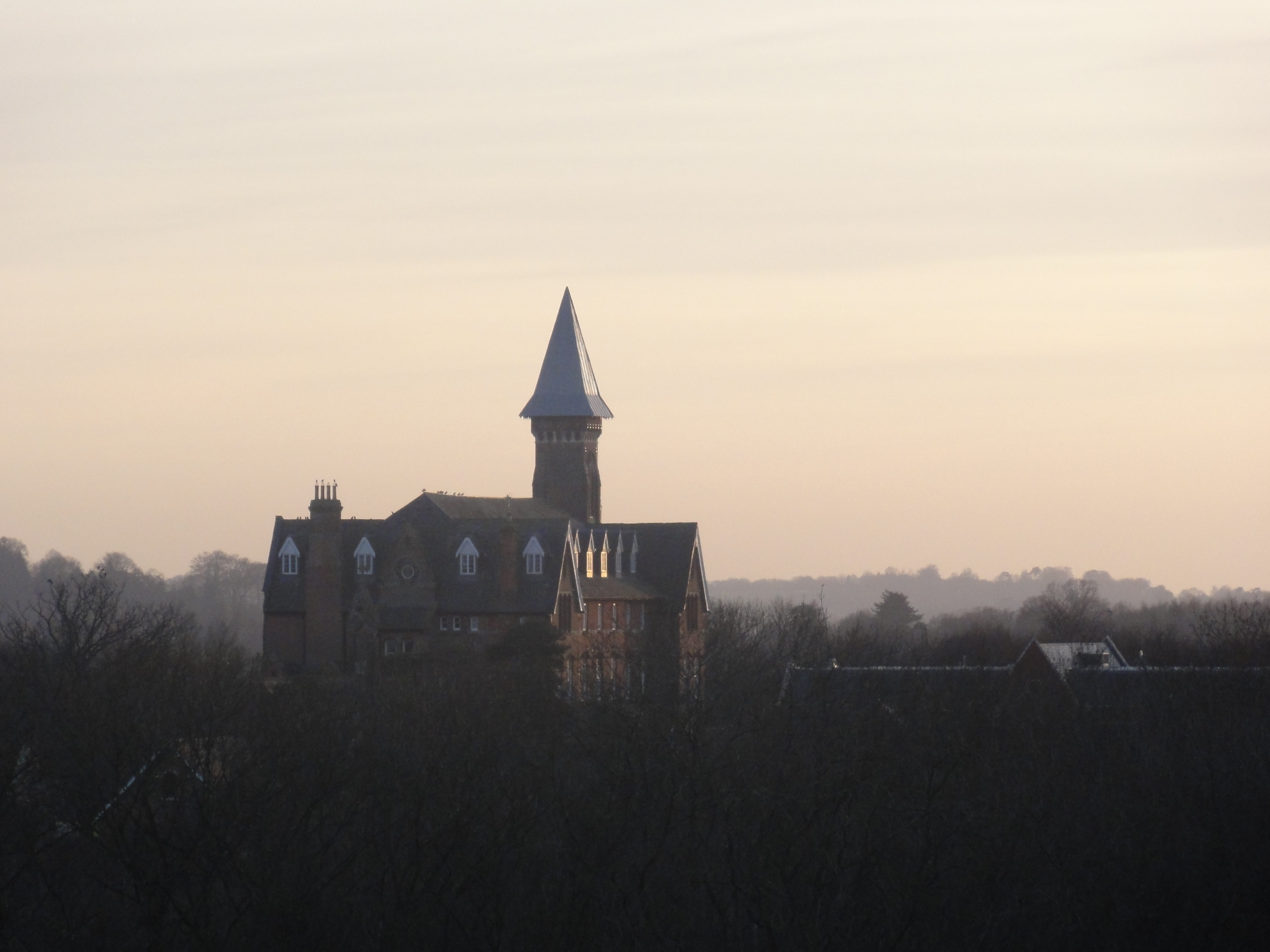
Mayfield College, the now defunct private boys' school.

St Leonards-Mayfield Roman Catholic girls' boarding school, which has existed since 1872, is situated on the High Street. The school consists of years seven up to thirteen. The head mistress is Miss Antonia Beary. The school is on the site of the Mayfield Old Palace which, after being founded by St Dunstan, used to be a lodging place for archbishops before being given to Henry VIII. It was rebuilt in the fourteenth century by Archbishop Simon Islip, and was owned by Thomas Cranmer before being given to Henry VIII in 1545. It was also used by Edward I and Queen Elizabeth I. After this, it fell into ruin but was purchased in 1863 by the Duchess of Leeds and given to the Society of the Holy Child, who established a convent there. The school was opened in 1872.

Mayfield College, a now-defunct boys' boarding school run by the Xaverian Brothers, was located in nearby Little Trodgers Lane. Following its closure its main building, designed by E. W. Pugin, has been converted to luxury apartments.

The village's Church of England primary school is mainly Edwardian but has modern additions.

== Five Ashes village ==
Between Mayfield and Heathfield lie two small hamlets: Cross-in-Hand and Five Ashes. The latter is part of the same parish as Mayfield.

=== Churches ===
The small village church was dedicated to The Good Shepherd until its demolition and replacement by an end of life hospice in 2019.

=== Commercial businesses ===
There are no retail shops in the village apart from a Porsche car dealership. There is also a pub called The Five Ashes Inn.

=== Schools ===
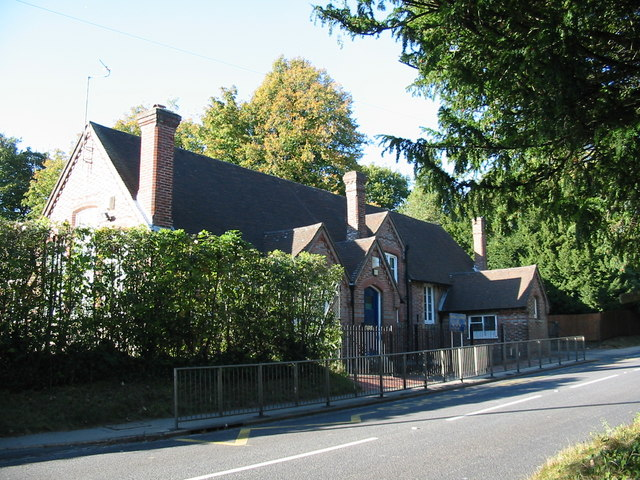
Five Ashes C of E Primary School

There are two schools in Five Ashes. Five Ashes Primary School is a small voluntary controlled Church of England school with around 45 children on roll. Skippers Hill Manor Preparatory School is a small private school founded in 1945 by Ray and Maureen Ward, remaining in the family until it was sold to Bellevue Education in 2010.

=== Parks and recreation ===
In Five Ashes, there is a large playing field where football and other games can be played and a skateboarding park. Adjoining the playing field and village hall is a children's playground.

In Stonehurst Lane, there is a park with wooded areas and ponds called Foxes Copse where dogs can be walked.

== Argos Hill ==
Rising about 7 miles (11 km) south of Royal Tunbridge Wells, Argos Hill is between the villages of Rotherfield and Mayfield. It is known for the landmark of Argos Hill Windmill, a grade II* listed building that was built between 1831 and 1843 and operational until 1927. It was restored in the 1960s, and was under threat of demolition in 2008. In 1939 Counties Ship Management renamed the cargo ship SS Canadian Constructor "Argos Hill".

== See also ==
- Walter Gale, the first schoolmaster of the primary school in Mayfield (now Mayfield Church of England Primary School)
