= John Kent (police officer) =

British police constable (1805–1886)

- Born: 1805; Hesket, England
- Died: 20 July 1886 (aged 80–81); Carlisle, England
- Other name: 'Black Kent'
- Known for: Britain's first black police officer

John Kent (1805 – 20 July 1886) was a British police constable at Maryport, then with the Carlisle City Police, and is reported to be the first black police officer in Britain. He served seven years in the office of constable at Carlisle before being dismissed from his role in 1844. He then became a court bailiff, then a Parish Constable at Longtown. Until 2006, when a former officer of Cumbria Constabulary discovered Kent's employment records, it was thought that Britain's first black police officer was Norwell Roberts, who was an officer with the Metropolitan Police starting in 1966 (however Astley Lloyd Blair joined Gloucestershire Constabulary as a Special Constable in 1964). The discovery has been heralded by the UK National Black Police Association as having "huge significance" as well as being "totally unexpected".

== Family and early life ==
Kent was the son of Thomas Kent, a seaman who worked on the estate of a Cumberland colonial civil servant in the West Indies. Kent's father is believed to have originally arrived at Whitehaven, England, where he worked at Abbey House, Calder Abbey, in the service of the Senhouse family, where he was 'considered a slave'. He was later given his freedom and went to sea. It is unknown the true origin of the Kent name, in John Kent's eulogy the father was said to have taken his surname from the region of England where his ship may firstly have docked. Thomas Kent married Mary Wilson in 1787 and the couple had nine children, some dying in childhood; John was the eighth born.

John Kent married a white woman, Mary from Longtown, and settled on Botchergate Street, first recorded in the 1841 national census. He was described as a "quiet, inoffensive man" as well as a "big powerful man" who worked for the local authority, laying down paving slabs, in his own words between the move from Maryport to Carlisle.

== Police career ==
Kent was originally at Maryport as a parish constable then joined Carlisle City Police force as a supernumerary Constable on 17 August 1837, later being made a substantive Constable 26 October 1837. He was known among city residents as "Black Kent" during his service, and this nickname was used by adults to scare unruly children.

Kent was credited with several arrests. He provided several accounts in his later years, one of arresting two "coiners". After arresting one suspect, he handcuffed him to the fire grate in his own house. He left an unloaded pistol with his wife, telling her to shoot the prisoner if he tried to escape. Kent then apprehended the second outstanding suspect.

In 1841, he was policing an election crowd in the city centre when it became violent. As the crowd became more unruly, a police officer was struck on the head by one of the crowd and died. The matter was recorded as a murder and Kent provided evidence of the general riot at Carlisle Assizes.

Police officers being drunk on duty was a common occurrence in the 19th century, as clean drinking water in the city was a rarity. On 6 December 1844, Kent arrived for duty while intoxicated. Owing to new policy, introduced by a new Chief Constable, to severely punish officers drunk on duty, Kent was instructed to attend a watch committee. He was later disciplined, and he was dismissed from the service on 12 December 1844. Accounts then show he was a court bailiff and then a parish constable in the Eskdale ward.

== Post-police service ==
Kent returned to work in Carlisle after leaving the police force. At the age of 78, he was recorded as being employed as an attendant in the service of the London and North Western Railway Companies, specifically working in the waiting rooms at Citadel station.

== Death ==
Kent died on 20 July 1886 at his home in Henry Street, Carlisle, and was buried in Carlisle Cemetery. His obituary in the Carlisle Journal announced that "Black Kent is Dead" and the Carlisle Patriot described the passing of Kent as "The Death of a Carlisle Notable".

== Contemporary recognition ==
Actor and comedian Lenny Henry has become interested in the story of John Kent, researching original documents at the Carlisle branch of Cumbria Archives and featuring in an item presented by Philippa Gregory on the BBC North East edition of 'Inside Out' on 27 February 2017 and the BBC North West edition of the same programme on 6 March 2017. In the programme Henry revealed that he would like to create a television programme telling Kent's story with himself playing the part of Kent but was having difficulty interesting television companies in backing the project.

== See also ==
- Fay Allen - first black policewoman in UK
