= Richard Burnham (clergyman) =

English clergyman and biographer

Richard Burnham (1711 – 1752) was an English clergyman and biographer. Born in Guildford, Surrey, he collected the dying sayings of more than a hundred pious persons and compiled the Pious Memorials, published in 1753 after his death. The Pious Memorials were reprinted at Paisley in 1788 with additions, and again enlarged in 1789. It was reprinted with a continuation by the Rev. George Burder in 1820, forming a large octavo volume, and there was a later stereotyped reprint.
