= Alison Heydari =

British police, security and criminal-justice leader

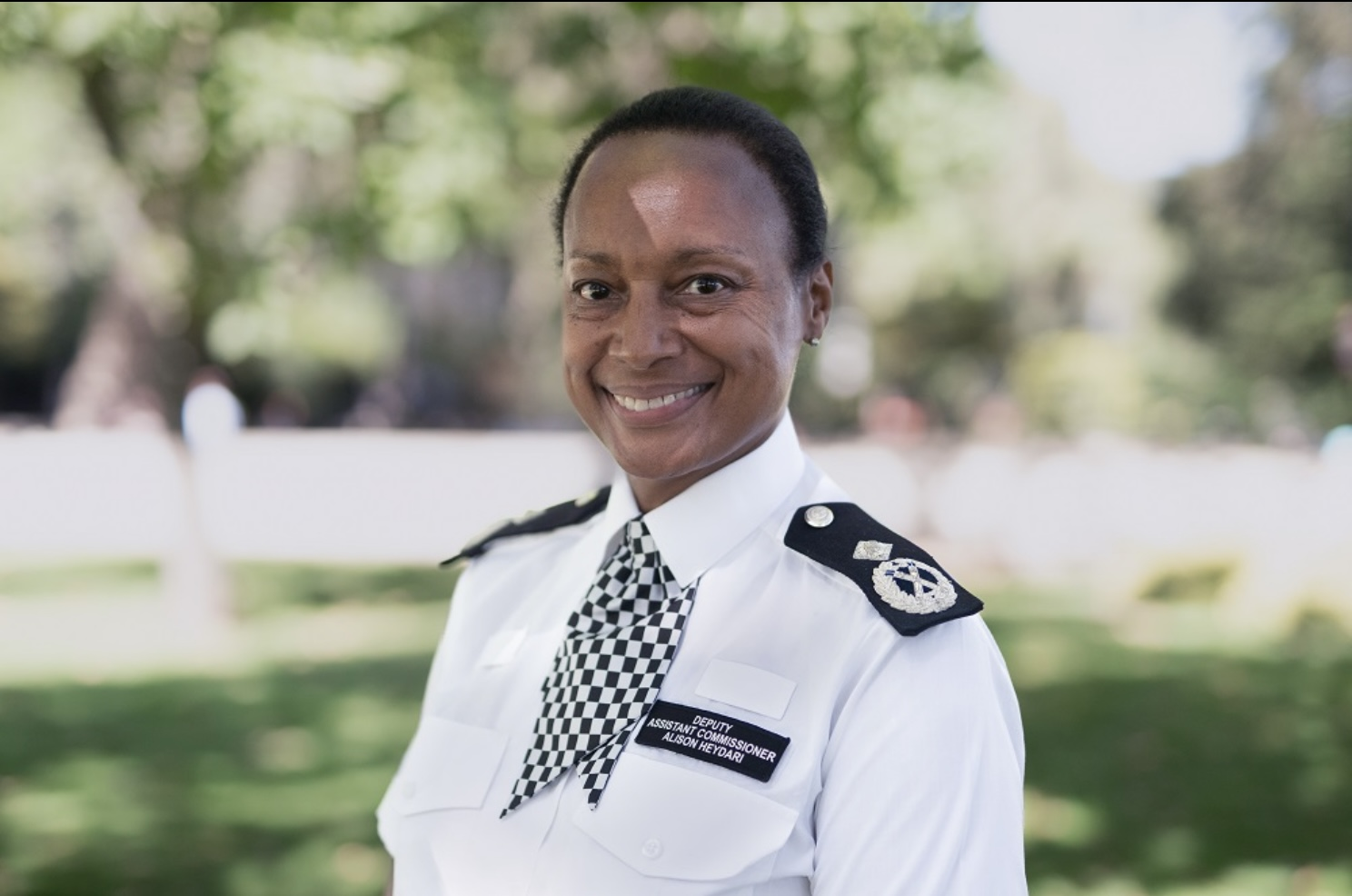

Alison Claire Heydari is a British chief police officer and criminal-justice leader serving as Commander for the Criminal Justice portfolio within Met Operations in the Metropolitan Police Service (MPS). Over a policing career beginning in 2000, she has held operational and strategic responsibilities encompassing criminal investigation, public protection, child-abuse investigation, emergency response, crisis negotiation, geographic command, major-event public-order command, pan-London neighbourhood policing, national criminal-justice policy and cross-force institutional reform.

Her career has progressed from direct responsibility for victims, offenders, investigations and frontline decision-making to the leadership of complex operational systems, national standards, performance frameworks and organisational change. Her work has involved policing, public order protection and security, community engagement, central and local government collaboration, criminal justice, independent oversight and academia, combining operational command with evidence-led policy and strategic partnership.

At a national level, Heydari has served as the National Police Chiefs' Council (NPCC) chief-officer lead for out-of-court resolutions and, at the temporary rank of Deputy Assistant Commissioner, directed a national cross-force reform programme operating across policing in England and Wales. Its principal territorial footprint encompassed all 43 territorial police forces and British Transport Police participating in national programme activity.

Heydari is a Visiting Fellow at Nuffield College, University of Oxford, and in 2026 was awarded an honorary Doctor of Business Administration by the University of Greenwich. The NPCC and the University of Greenwich have described her as the most senior Black female police officer in the United Kingdom. She is one of only two women of colour serving as chief police officers in England and Wales.

== Early life and background ==
Heydari was born and brought up in South London. She is the eldest of four children. Her parents came to Britain from Guyana towards the end of the Windrush era and met after arriving in London.

Heydari attended Rosa Bassett Grammar School in South London. After completing her O levels and A levels, she attended Chelsea School of Art.

Her parents travelled extensively with Heydari and her siblings while they were growing up, giving the family early experience of different countries, cultures and communities. She has described a childhood shaped by family, hard work, fairness, personal responsibility and a strong sense of community. Growing up in a diverse London household brought her into contact from an early age with people from different backgrounds and perspectives, an experience she has subsequently connected with her approach to public service.

Heydari initially considered a career in art. However, after accompanying officers on a ride-along, she said that the experience confirmed her decision to pursue policing as a means of contributing directly to public life.

== Education and research ==
Heydari holds a first-class BSc in Social Policy, an MSc in Criminology and Criminal Justice and a Postgraduate Certificate in Education. She is also a Chartered Management Institute Fellow at level seven in Strategic Leadership and Management and in Coaching and Mentoring.

In October 2019, the University of Portsmouth awarded her a PhD for the thesis Enhancing the experience of procedural justice for domestic abuse survivors by improving the policing response.

Her research drew upon evidence from survivors, frontline officers, senior police leaders and independent domestic-abuse professionals and used quantitative and qualitative approaches, including Interpretative Phenomenological Analysis. It examined the effects of communication, workload, training, organisational culture, risk management, scrutiny, supervision and leadership upon the quality of police decision-making and the experience of victims.

The research concluded that clear direction, appropriate scrutiny, effective training and properly supported officers could improve both risk management and the quality of service received by victims. It connected procedural justice and institutional legitimacy with practical improvements in policing performance.

The relationship between evidence, fair decision-making, operational effectiveness and public confidence subsequently became a recurring feature of Heydari's professional work.

== Police career ==
=== Hampshire Constabulary ===
Heydari joined Hampshire Constabulary as a student officer at the end of 2000 and, after training, was initially deployed in Southampton. She entered the Home Office Accelerated Promotion Scheme for Graduates and was promoted to sergeant after just over two years' service.

Her subsequent appointments included detective work in the Criminal Investigation Department and responsibilities across serious crime, public protection, child-abuse investigation, cold-case review, domestic abuse, hate crime and the protection of vulnerable people.

She later held geographic commands in both urban and rural areas and had responsibility for emergency-response policing. For eight years she also served as a crisis negotiator, requiring disciplined communication, management of rapidly developing risk and decision-making in situations where consequences could be immediate.

As Southampton Police Commander, Heydari chaired the Southampton Safe City Partnership, working with local government, elected representatives and partner agencies on crime reduction, reoffending, antisocial behaviour, public safety and community resilience.

Her Hampshire career also included force-level strategic responsibility for victim care, hate crime and harmful practices, together with a secondment to His Majesty's Inspectorate of Constabulary and Fire & Rescue Services. This gave her experience both of delivering policing operationally and of examining organisational performance and governance from an inspection perspective.

During her command career, Heydari also managed significant community, security and public-safety issues associated with terrorism in Portsmouth and hate crime in Southampton.

She subsequently qualified as a Public Order and Public Safety commander, ultimately becoming a Gold Commander, extending her experience into the strategic command of major events, security and high-risk operations.

=== Metropolitan Police Service ===
In June 2020, Heydari joined the Metropolitan Police Service as a chief officer and Frontline Policing Commander, with additional pan-London responsibility for neighbourhood policing.

As senior responsible officer for the Met's Strongest Ever Neighbourhood Policing programme, she helped establish the operating model, training, tasking and performance arrangements associated with plans for additional Police Community Support Officers and police officers. The programme incorporated Clear Hold Build, an intelligence-led approach combining targeted enforcement with sustained partnership activity and longer-term prevention in places affected by serious and organised crime.

During Heydari's leadership of the neighbourhood-policing portfolio, Town Centre Teams were implemented across all 12 Basic Command Units. The model comprised 19 Town Centre Teams, approximately 500 officers, together with plans for 150 additional Dedicated Ward Officers concentrated in areas assessed as experiencing comparatively high levels of risk, harm and demand.

The teams combined visible policing, intelligence-led deployment, enforcement, partnership tasking and neighbourhood problem-solving.

The Met's published 2021-24 executive structure also listed Commander Heydari within Specialist Operations - Security and Protection, alongside the Protection and Security Commands.

Heydari's London command experience has included the management of numerous critical incidents, major public events and complex safeguarding operations. For example, as a qualified Public Order and Public Safety Gold Commander, she served as Gold Commander for Pride in London three years in succession, assuming strategic responsibility for policing, deployment, public safety and engagement across a major central-London event.

In 2021, Heydari also chaired the Metropolitan Police Gold Group for Operation Topale, established following the Everyone's Invited disclosures concerning sexual harassment, sexual assault and rape in educational settings. At that stage more than 10,000 testimonies had been published. The policing response required coordination between safer-schools policing, neighbourhood teams, specialist safeguarding functions, children's services, local safeguarding partnerships and national policing structures.

These responsibilities added strategic incident command and complex multi-agency safeguarding to an operational background already encompassing investigation, public protection, emergency response and crisis negotiation.

Heydari has also been required to account publicly for operational policy and performance. In 2023, as the Met's Local Policing Commander, she appeared before the London Assembly Police and Crime Committee alongside senior representatives of policing, the Mayor's Office for Policing and Crime and London local government to give evidence on neighbourhood policing and delivery in the capital.

In 2021, Heydari launched Behind the Badge, a careers and public-engagement initiative designed to improve understanding of the range of roles within modern policing. Its work included engagement with prospective Black applicants and young people who might otherwise have had limited exposure to frontline, specialist, operational-support and police-staff careers.

== National criminal-justice leadership ==
In 2021, Heydari became the NPCC chief-officer lead for out-of-court resolutions, placing her within the national governance of criminal-justice policy across England and Wales.

Her portfolio included responsibility for the national strategic direction of out-of-court resolutions and preparation for the statutory cautioning reforms contained in Part 6 of the Police, Crime, Sentencing and Courts Act 2022.

A national readiness review conducted as part of implementation received responses from 41 of the 43 territorial police forces. The work identified operational and resource requirements, involved the College of Policing in determining training needs and included engagement with the Home Office concerning implementation support.

The portfolio also explored the use of Project Fulcrum as a national digital mechanism intended to improve connectivity, efficiency, consistency and equal treatment in the application of diversionary interventions.

National guidance on Outcome 22 developed through the portfolio was consulted upon across police forces and approved through Chief Constables' Council.

In 2023, the Ministry of Justice identified Heydari as the NPCC policing lead when publishing proposals for a simplified national framework based upon Community Cautions and Diversionary Cautions.

The framework sought greater consistency while preserving a clear distinction between offences requiring prosecution and those for which an immediate, enforceable intervention could reduce further offending. It incorporated rehabilitation, reparation and victims' views while maintaining prosecution for serious and persistent offenders.

The work placed Heydari at the intersection of policing, legislation, prosecution, victims, offenders, courts and crime prevention.

Her work in this area has also been subjected to external evaluation. In 2025, Heydari participated in a research collaboration with the Universities of Birmingham, Leeds and York supported through the Cabinet Office Evaluation Accelerator Fund, examining whether Outcome 22 out-of-court resolutions were effective in reducing crime.

The project reflected a consistent principle in her approach: implementation should be followed by evidence and public policy should be capable of demonstrating its effect.

== National cross-force policing reform ==
Police leaders agreed in 2020 to establish a coordinated national programme following longstanding evidence - including official statistics, independent scrutiny and reviews of the exercise of police powers - showing significant disparities in the experiences and outcomes of Black communities interacting with policing.

The programme also addressed a wider operational concern. Where communities experiencing substantial levels of victimisation have insufficient confidence in policing, offences may be less readily reported, intelligence may be lost, witnesses may be less willing to cooperate and opportunities to prevent or solve crime may consequently be reduced.

Its underlying proposition was therefore both practical and institutional: police powers should be exercised lawfully and consistently, every community should receive effective protection from crime, and public confidence should strengthen operational effectiveness.

In August 2023, Heydari was appointed to direct this national, ambitious cross-force policing reform programme, jointly led by the National Police Chiefs' Council and the College of Policing and formally titled the Police Race Action Plan. The appointment was publicly announced in September 2023.

The programme had the commitment of chief constables across all 43 territorial police forces in England and Wales, with British Transport Police participating directly in national activity.

A major national workforce survey incorporated the experiences of approximately 1,600 Black officers and staff across 44 forces, establishing a national evidence base against which future organisational change could be assessed.

Heydari's remit required her to collaborate with stakeholders including autonomous police forces, chief constables, national policing portfolios, government departments, the College of Policing, police and crime commissioners, HMICFRS, the Crown Prosecution Service, independent scrutiny bodies and civil-society organisations.

The assignment therefore depended heavily upon strategic influence and negotiation. Unlike conventional line command, the Programme Director did not hold direct authority over each organisation responsible for delivery.

Heydari assumed responsibility at a point when independent scrutiny had called for clearer priorities, stronger resourcing, improved engagement, better communication and more credible measures of performance.

The programme moved from a largely activity-led structure towards one based upon national standards, evidence, assurance and accountability. A maturity matrix was developed containing 14 national standards, supported by quantitative and qualitative measures. The framework allowed forces to assess and evidence delivery through a consistent model incorporating self-assessment, moderation, peer review, community scrutiny and publication.

A structured programme of direct force engagement accompanied the framework. By early 2026, visits had been completed with 40 forces, allowing governance, implementation and performance to be examined directly rather than relying solely upon written returns.

The programme also became the only national policing programme with a standing item at Chief Constables' Council, providing direct access to the principal collective decision-making forum for police chiefs in England and Wales. Chief constables received regular progress reports, could question the Programme Director and were able to examine their own force-level responsibilities.

Heydari also co-authored national papers with NPCC chair Chief Constable Gavin Stephens, placing programme delivery directly before the collective leadership of policing.

Its partnerships increasingly extended beyond policing.

Joint work with the Crown Prosecution Service developed into broader activity concerning disparities across the criminal-justice system and involved organisations including policing, government departments, prisons and probation, and inspectorates.

A national conference in 2025 brought together 150 participants, including the Policing Minister, chief officers, regulators, policing representatives and community stakeholders. Separate civil-society engagement involved approximately 40 organisations and representatives from policing, criminal justice, independent scrutiny and public-interest bodies.

The programme generated an increasingly substantial national evidence base. Public consultation attracted more than 5,000 responses, while successive workforce surveys involved approximately 1,600 and 1,500 serving Black officers and staff.

Published government and policing material records work during this period including:

- national guidance concerning body-worn video;
- independent research and recommendations on Taser use;
- improved recording and analysis of ethnicity during traffic stops;
- establishment of a National Community Reference Group;
- work concerning missing people; and
- measures intended to improve the treatment of children within the criminal-justice system.

In January 2026, Home Secretary Shabana Mahmood told the House of Commons that future deployment of policing powers and technology should be consistent with the Plan and tested to ensure that all communities received an appropriate quality of policing. She placed this within the established principle that policing should operate "without fear or favour".

Government policy subsequently committed to incorporating relevant Police Race Action Plan data into future iterations of the national Police Performance Framework.

The significance of this development was institutional rather than legislative. The Plan itself did not become an Act of Parliament; instead, standards, evidence and accountability mechanisms developed through the programme began to move into the national arrangements through which police performance would be assessed and scrutinised.

The programme also developed an international dimension.

In December 2025, Heydari participated in a knowledge-sharing visit with the Netherlands police, comparing operational and organisational approaches across jurisdictions.

On 17 March 2026, she represented the National Police Chiefs' Council at the 100th plenary meeting of the European Commission against Racism and Intolerance at the Council of Europe in Strasbourg. She participated in an expert exchange on law-enforcement practice with European Member States. The engagement provided an opportunity both to communicate experience from policing in England and Wales and to compare operational and governance approaches across jurisdictions. Heydari received a Chief Constable's Commendation in recognition of her work on the national programme.

Taken together, the assignment required a form of executive leadership distinct from direct operational command: rebuilding organisational capability, setting common standards across autonomous institutions, reconciling policing, governmental, regulatory and external perspectives, establishing measurable accountability and securing sustained action principally through influence rather than hierarchical authority.

== Commander for Criminal Justice ==
Following her period directing the national programme, the Metropolitan Police senior-management structure lists Heydari as Commander for Criminal Justice within Met Operations.

Criminal Justice occupies a critical position between frontline policing and the wider justice system. Investigations must become evidentially sound cases; appropriate charging decisions must be secured; offenders must be dealt with effectively; victims and witnesses must remain engaged; and policing must work successfully with prosecutors, courts and partner agencies.

The Met's current strategy identifies improved case-file quality, faster progress through the criminal-justice process, stronger operational evidence, offender management and closer partnership with the Crown Prosecution Service among its priorities.

Heydari's current appointment therefore brings together her experience of investigations, victim care, offender intervention, evidence-led decision-making and national criminal-justice reform within an area where police performance has a direct bearing on whether offenders are brought to justice, repeat offending is reduced and victims receive a timely and effective service.

== Academic and international work ==
Heydari's professional experience has also included academic and international work.

In 2011, following a competitive selection process, she spent approximately six months at John Jay College of Criminal Justice in New York, teaching Comparative Policing Systems and International Criminal Justice to undergraduate and postgraduate students. It was during this time that Heydari carried out research in New York, examining the operational response of NYPD to victims of domestic abuse living in public housing.

She has also undertaken work in São Paulo, Brazil, supporting victims of human trafficking, extending her professional experience of vulnerability, exploitation and public protection into an international context.

In April 2025, Heydari was elected to a Visiting Fellowship at Nuffield College, University of Oxford.

Later that year she delivered a lecture entitled Trust, Performance and the Future of Public Service. The event examined the relationship between institutional legitimacy, effective decision-making, public confidence and the practical challenge of implementing national reform across a complex policing system.

In July 2026, the University of Greenwich conferred upon Heydari an Honorary Doctor of Business Administration. The university's citation recognised her investigative and public-protection background, London-wide neighbourhood-policing responsibilities, national criminal-justice leadership and direction of the Police Race Action Plan.

The award recognised her commitment to public service, work extending beyond technical policing practice into organisational leadership, governance, evidence-led transformation, cross-sector collaboration and institutional trust.

== Personal interests and leadership approach ==
Heydari is an experienced horse rider with approximately 20 years of riding experience. After joining the Metropolitan Police she completed mounted-policing training and became the most senior Met officer qualified to ride operationally. Her policing duties have included mounted duties on Coronation Day and at the Changing of the Guard, including welcoming members of the public.

She has described service on Coronation Day as a privilege and has spoken about mounted policing as an effective means of creating accessible and positive contact between police officers and members of the public.

Together with her South London upbringing and her parents' Windrush-era journey from Guyana to Britain, these experiences form part of a career rooted in British public service while extending across national and international institutions.

Heydari has continued to coach and mentor officers and staff and has supported the development and progression of women within policing and the fair treatment of the communities served by police.

In published interviews, Heydari has identified humility, listening, fairness, resilience, respect and recognition of good work as important leadership disciplines. She has argued that clear expectations and appropriate challenge should be accompanied by support, acknowledgement and a shared understanding of purpose.

That approach is consistent with both her academic research and her subsequent leadership record. Across operational policing, criminal justice and national reform, support for people has been accompanied by evidence, formal performance measures, scrutiny and accountability.

Her career has therefore encompassed two complementary forms of senior leadership: direct operational command, requiring responsibility for people, public safety and difficult decisions under pressure; and strategic leadership through influence, requiring autonomous institutions, senior professionals, government, regulators and external stakeholders to be aligned behind common objectives where direct command authority is unavailable.

Across both, a recurring feature has been the translation of complex objectives into practical structures - operating models, standards, partnerships, evidence and performance arrangements - through which outcomes can be assessed and sustained.
