= Henry Fowler (hymn writer) =

Henry Fowler (11 December 1779 – 1838), was an English hymn-writer.

Fowler was born at Yealmpton, Devonshire. In early life he followed some trade, but occasionally preached in independent meeting-houses in Devonshire and at Bristol. At length, in October 1813, he 'received a call' to Birmingham, where he continued until the end of 1819.

Ultimately he settled in London, becoming in July 1820 minister of Gower Street Chapel. He died 16 December 1838, and he was buried on Christmas Day morning at the New Bunhill Fields burying-ground at Islington. As 'a close, searching preacher,’ Fowler had for some years an excellent congregation, and a tolerable one to the close of his life. 'His discourses were delivered chiefly in short, pithy sentences.' It has been said that his own frame of mind seemed, in general, rather gloomy; certainly his autobiography, which he called 'Travels in the Wilderness,’ 8vo, London, 1839, is not cheerful reading. In addition to this and numerous religious tracts and biographies, he wrote 'Original Hymns, Doctrinal, Practical, and Experimental, with prose reflections,’ 2 vols. 18mo, Birmingham, London, 1818–1824, and edited 'A Selection of Hymns, by various authors,’ 18mo, London, 1836. His portrait has been engraved by R. Cooper.
