= Wattisham =

Village in Suffolk, England

Coordinates: 52.12527°N 0.93868°E

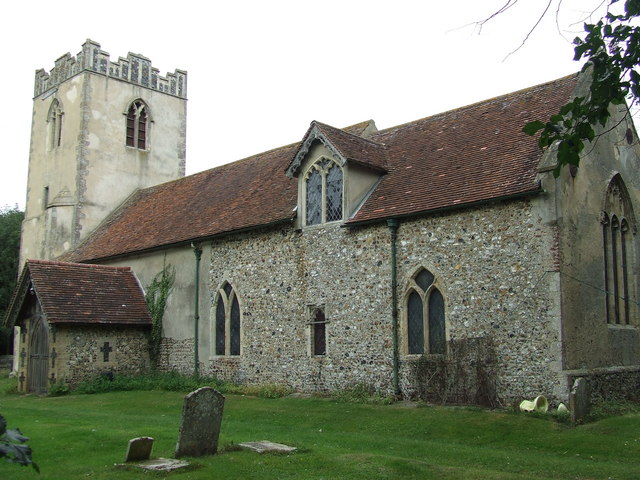
- St Nicholas’s Church, Wattisham

- Location within Suffolk
- Population: 110 (2005)
- OS grid reference: TM012515
- District: Babergh
- Shire county: Suffolk
- Region: East
- Country: England
- Sovereign state: United Kingdom
- Post town: IPSWICH
- Postcode district: IP7
- Police: Suffolk
- Fire: Suffolk
- Ambulance: East of England
- UK Parliament: South Suffolk

Wattisham is a village and civil parish near to the town of Stowmarket in Suffolk, England. From the 2011 Census the population of the parish was 110, according to the Office for National Statistics, included in the civil parish of Hitcham.

== Wattisham Airfield ==
The village houses an airfield. Formerly known as RAF Wattisham, it was one of the front-line airfields in the Cold War. The RAF moved out in March 1993 and it is now the largest Army Air Corps airfield in the United Kingdom. The airbase is now named Wattisham Airfield.

== Landmarks ==
The parish church of St Nicholas was declared redundant by the Diocese of St Edmundsbury and Ipswich in the 1970s but was taken over by a charitable trust, who use it for concerts and exhibitions, with profits reinvested into caring for the building. Diocesan architect Henry Munro Cautley (1875-1959), in his 1937 Suffolk Churches and their Treasures, found little to interest him except an armorial shield.

North of the village is Wattisham Castle, dating from the eighteenth and nineteenth centuries. The Wattisham Strict Baptist Chapel is located in the village.

== Climate ==
Climate data for Wattisham (1991-2020 normals, extremes 1959-)
Month	Jan	Feb	Mar	Apr	May	Jun	Jul	Aug	Sep	Oct	Nov	Dec	Year
Record high °C (°F)	14.4 (57.9)	17.7 (63.9)	21.7 (71.1)	25.7 (78.3)	31.5 (88.7)	36.9 (98.4)	35.7 (96.3)	35.3 (95.5)	30.4 (86.7)	28.2 (82.8)	17.9 (64.2)	15.3 (59.5)	36.9 (98.4)
Mean daily maximum °C (°F)	6.9 (44.4)	7.5 (45.5)	10.2 (50.4)	13.5 (56.3)	16.7 (62.1)	19.7 (67.5)	22.2 (72.0)	22.1 (71.8)	18.9 (66.0)	14.5 (58.1)	10.1 (50.2)	7.3 (45.1)	14.2 (57.6)
Daily mean °C (°F)	4.2 (39.6)	4.4 (39.9)	6.5 (43.7)	9.0 (48.2)	12.1 (53.8)	15.0 (59.0)	17.3 (63.1)	17.3 (63.1)	14.6 (58.3)	11.1 (52.0)	7.2 (45.0)	4.6 (40.3)	10.3 (50.5)
Mean daily minimum °C (°F)	1.4 (34.5)	1.4 (34.5)	2.8 (37.0)	4.5 (40.1)	7.5 (45.5)	10.3 (50.5)	12.4 (54.3)	12.5 (54.5)	10.4 (50.7)	7.7 (45.9)	4.2 (39.6)	1.9 (35.4)	6.4 (43.5)
Record low °C (°F)	−14.6 (5.7)	−10.0 (14.0)	−8.6 (16.5)	−4.6 (23.7)	−2.3 (27.9)	−0.4 (31.3)	3.8 (38.8)	3.6 (38.5)	1.5 (34.7)	−3.5 (25.7)	−7.0 (19.4)	−13.2 (8.2)	−14.6 (5.7)
Average precipitation mm (inches)	48.5 (1.91)	44.1 (1.74)	40.2 (1.58)	38.5 (1.52)	51.2 (2.02)	52.3 (2.06)	55.5 (2.19)	61.6 (2.43)	50.1 (1.97)	62.8 (2.47)	62.0 (2.44)	56.1 (2.21)	623.0 (24.53)
Average precipitation days (≥ 1.0 mm)	11.1	10.3	8.9	9.1	7.9	8.6	9.0	9.4	8.8	10.6	11.5	11.7	117.0
Mean monthly sunshine hours	64.4	83.4	125.3	183.0	217.1	213.8	218.3	203.4	160.2	116.8	75.4	60.4	1,721.5
Source 1: Met Office
Source 2: Starlings Roost Weather
