= J. C. Philpot =

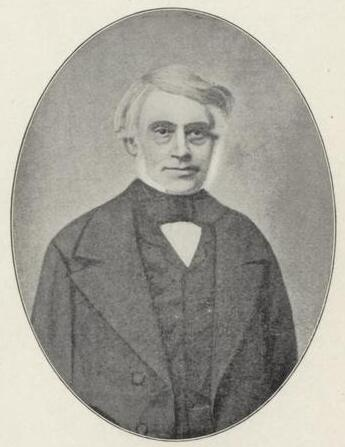
Joseph Charles Philpot

Joseph Charles Philpot (13 September 1802 – 9 December 1869) was an English minister.

Philpot was born in Ripple, Kent, the son of a Church of England minister. He was educated at Merchant Taylors School and St Paul's School, London, before graduating from Worcester College, Oxford in 1824. Two years later he moved to Ireland to work as a tutor, where he experienced a religious conversion. Philpot returned to Oxford in 1827, became a fellow of Worcester, and was ordained a priest in the Church of England the following year. He served as curate of Stadhampton and Chiselhampton but resigned from the Church of England in 1835, citing its rampant worldliness. Philpot was baptized as a believer and became a Strict and Particular Baptist preacher. He edited the Gospel Standard magazine from 1840 until his death.

According to Robert W. Oliver, Philpot "was undoubtedly the most scholarly and erudite Strict Baptist minister of his generation, possibly the most able leader the Gospel Standard group of churches have ever had." Philpot's sermons are still read by conservative Reformed Christians in the Netherlands.
