= Richard Burnham (minister) =

Richard Burnham (1749? – 30 October 1810) was an English Christian minister and hymn-writer. He was a Wesleyan in High Wycombe and was a Baptist minister in Staines. He was London from 1780 until his death.

== Biography ==
In his youth he lived in High Wycombe and attended the Wesleyan chapel there. As a young adult he was invited to preach. He was afterwards baptised by T. Davis of Reading, joined a Baptist church and was ordained for ministry. He was then chosen as minister by a few people at Staines, but they were so poor as to be unable to support him and this led to his leaving Staines.

Burnham was the author of a small volume of New Hymns printed in 1783; it was subsequently enlarged and in 1803 was reprinted with considerable additions, numbering 452 hymns. Nine of these appear in Songs of Grace and Glory (1871). He went to London, and in 1780 preached in Green Walk, on the Surrey side of Blackfriars Bridge.

Burnham published The Triumphs of Free Grace in 1787, including an account of his experience and call to the ministry. When John Martin's people left for Store Street in 1795, Burnham took Ebenezer Chapel in Grafton Street vacated by them, where he remained till his death in 1810 at the age of 62. In 1806 he published Five Interesting Letters, and an Elegy on the Death of Lord Nelson. A portrait of Burnham appears in some copies of his hymn-book.

He was buried at Tottenham Court Chapel. The inscription on his gravestone is given in full in Wilson's Dissenting Churches, with an account of Burnham. He was succeeded at Grafton Street by John Stevens, afterwards of Meards Court, Soho. His funeral sermon, preached by William Crawford of Ewer Street, Southwark, including some account of Burnham's life, was published in 1810.
