= Gospel Standard =

The Gospel Standard is a Strict Baptist monthly magazine first published in 1835 by William Gadsby. It is the tenth oldest monthly magazine still in print in the British Isles.

Many Strict Baptist churches are affiliated with and recognised by the publishers of the Gospel Standard. Churches which align themselves with the magazine are known as "Gospel Standard Strict Baptists".

== Editors of the Gospel Standard ==
The Gospel Standard has had 18 editors since it was first printed. These were:

1. William Gadsby (1835 - 1840)
2. John Gadsby (1835 - 1840, 1870 - 1877)
3. John M'Kenzie (1836 - 1849)
4. Joseph Charles Philpot (1836 - 1869)
5. Grey Hazlerigg (1878 - 1880)
6. Charles Hemnington (1881 - 1882, 1884)
7. Joseph Hatton (1881 - 1884)
8. James Dennett (1884 - 1891)
9. Alfred Coughtrey (1891 - 1898)
10. Enoch Feazey (1899 - 1905)
11. James Kidwell Popham (1905 - 1935)
12. John Hervey Gosden (1935 - 1964)
13. Sydney Frank Paul (1964 - 1970)
14. Benjamin Ashworth Ramsbottom (1971 - 2015)
15. Tim Rosier (2016 - 2020)
16. Stephan Rosier (2020)
17. Gerald Buss (2020 - 2025)
18. Matthew Hyde (2026 - Present)
