= List of places of worship in Eastbourne =

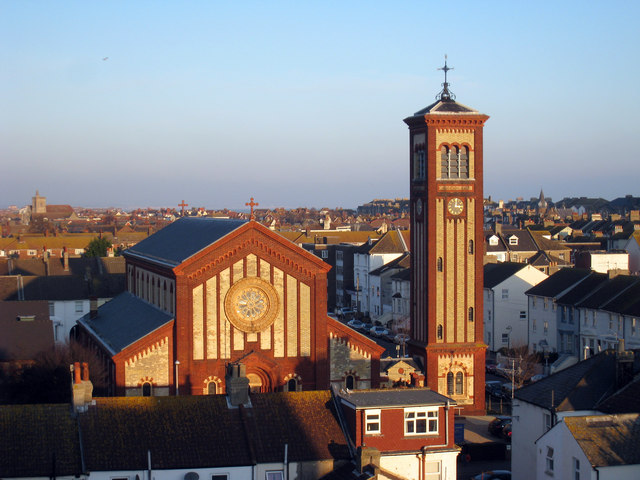
Eastbourne's stock of Anglican church buildings includes All Souls Church, a polychromatic Byzantine building with a prominent campanile, built by Alfred Strong in 1882.

The borough of Eastbourne, one of six local government districts in the English county of East Sussex, has more than 50 current and former churches and other places of worship. Several other former places of worship are still in existence but are no longer in religious use. The borough is on the English Channel coast and encompasses the town of Eastbourne and its suburbs. Until the late 18th century, the area was mostly farmland punctuated by four well-spread hamlets; but a fashionable seaside resort gradually developed from about 1780, based on a combination of royal patronage, a good climate, railway connections and the demands of rich visitors. Church-building rapidly followed; and although the town lacks the range of "worthwhile Victorian churches" found in seaside resorts such as Brighton and Bournemouth, a wide variety of architectural themes and denominations are represented. 46 places of worship are in use in the borough and a further nine former churches and chapels no longer hold religious services but survive in alternative uses.

Most residents of Eastbourne identify themselves as Christian, and churches representing many Christian denominations exist in the town. The largest number of these, including the town's oldest church, belong to the Church of England, the country's officially established church. Several Nonconformist and Roman Catholic churches were founded in the 19th century, while new churches were established on housing estates such as The Hydneye and Langney as the town grew inland. There are also Jewish and Muslim places of worship.

Historic England or its predecessor English Heritage have awarded listed status to several current and former church buildings in Eastbourne. A building is defined as "listed" when it is placed on a statutory register of buildings of "special architectural or historic interest" in accordance with the Planning (Listed Buildings and Conservation Areas) Act 1990. The Department for Digital, Culture, Media and Sport, a Government department, is responsible for this; Historic England, a non-departmental public body, acts as an agency of the department to administer the process and advise the department on relevant issues. There are three grades of listing status. Grade I, the highest, is defined as being of "exceptional interest"; Grade II* is used for "particularly important buildings of more than special interest"; and Grade II, the lowest, is used for buildings of "special interest".

== Overview and history of religious worship in Eastbourne ==
Eastbourne's location within East Sussex

The borough of Eastbourne covers 4,416 hectares (10,910 acres; 17.05 sq mi) of the English Channel coast and its hinterland in southeast England and is home to approximately 100,000 people. The district of Wealden surrounds it to the west and north; the English Channel is to the east and south. High cliffs, including Beachy Head, rise in the southwest corner. The area was inhabited in the Stone Age, and a large Roman villa stood near the present-day Eastbourne Pier. Four hamlets developed independently on the mainly agricultural land behind the cliffs: Meads, Seahouses, South Bourne and Bourne (also referred to as Old Town or East Bourne). Farming, fishing and occasional smuggling were the main activities, and religious worship was focused on Old Town's 12th-century St Mary the Virgin Church, a large flint and stone structure with later additions. Sea-bathing and drinking seawater for medicinal reasons, popularised by Dr Richard Russell in nearby Brighton, became popular in the late 18th century at Bourne's beach, and a visit by Prince Edward in 1780 encouraged tourism. All the land in the area was owned by two rich families: the Davies-Gilberts and the Dukes of Devonshire. They oversaw the development of the town, ensured architectural harmony and encouraged the construction of a range of facilities appropriate to a growing, high-class town—from theatres and private schools to churches. Unlike at Brighton, Worthing and other Sussex seaside resorts, development was slow and steady with periods of stability and inactivity.

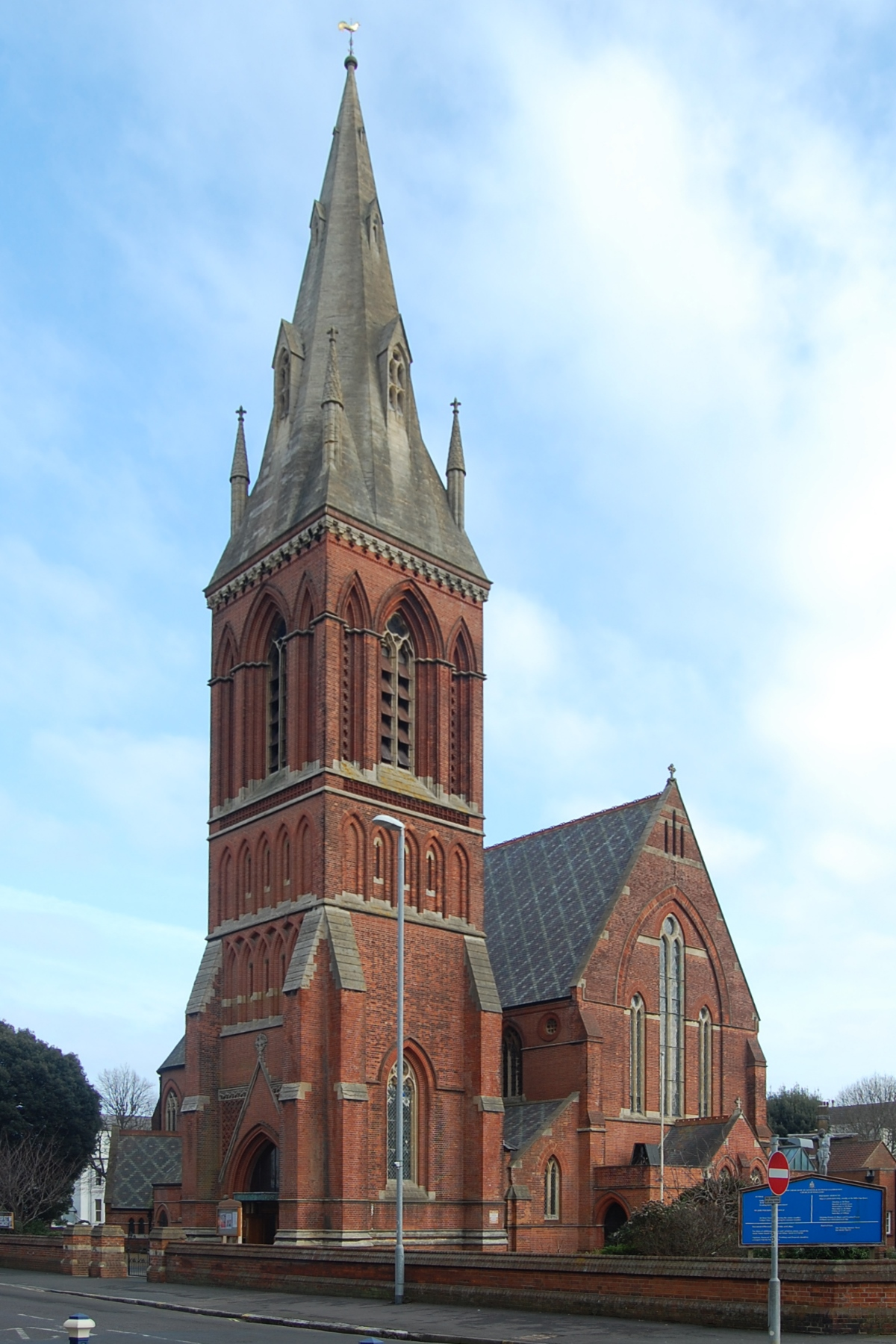
St Saviour's Church, with its 176-foot (54 m) broach spire, "is accepted as the finest Victorian church in the town".

Into this quiet, high-class environment, with its libraries and expensive lodging-houses, came Canon Thomas Pitman—Vicar of Eastbourne for 62 years from 1828. He recognised that the town needed a new Anglican church closer to the focus of seafront development, convinced William Cavendish, 7th Duke of Devonshire to donate land, and raised £2,500 (£284,000 as of 2023) himself. The chapel of ease to St Mary the Virgin Church, designed by Decimus Burton and opened in 1838, later became Holy Trinity Church—modern Eastbourne's first Anglican church. More churches were built throughout the Victorian era, especially in the town centre: Benjamin Ferrey's Christ Church opened in 1859; St Saviour's Church was built eight years later on another tract of land donated by the Duke of Devonshire; London-based architect A.P. Strong's multicoloured All Souls Church, funded by Lady Victoria Wellesley, opened in 1882; and St Peter's Church (demolished in 1971) was built by Henry Currey in 1894 to replace a temporary church of 1878. The Meads and Upperton suburbs were served by St John the Evangelist's Church (1869) and St Anne's Church (1881) respectively. The architectural quality of these churches has been described—notably by Nairn and Pevsner in the Buildings of England series of books—as inferior to that of other southern English seaside resorts, in particular Brighton and Bournemouth. George Edmund Street's St Saviour's Church is considered the best by most architectural historians (including Pevsner and Goodhart-Rendel), in particular because of its dominance of the townscape and the Spanish-influenced narrowing of the interior towards the chancel in order to emphasise that part of the building. All Souls Church is "one of the most striking Victorian churches in Sussex" because of its enormous campanile, brightly coloured brickwork, intricate terracotta work and Italianate/Romanesque/Byzantine architecture.

Eastbourne was ravaged by bombs during World War II—it was the worst hit town on the south coast of England—and several churches were damaged or destroyed. St Anne's Church in Upperton was wrecked, and demolished without replacement in 1955; only the tower of St John the Evangelist's Church in Meads survived; a Junkers Ju 88 destroyed St Mary's Church at Hampden Park (again, apart from its bell tower) in 1940; and the newly built St Elisabeth's Church on Victoria Drive was damaged. After the war, new Anglican churches were built on two 20th-century housing estates: St Peter's at Hydneye dates from 1953, and St Richard's in Langney was completed in 1956. Some older Anglican churches have since been demolished, although one—St Philip's in the east end of town—was replaced by a mixed-use building which retains some worship space.

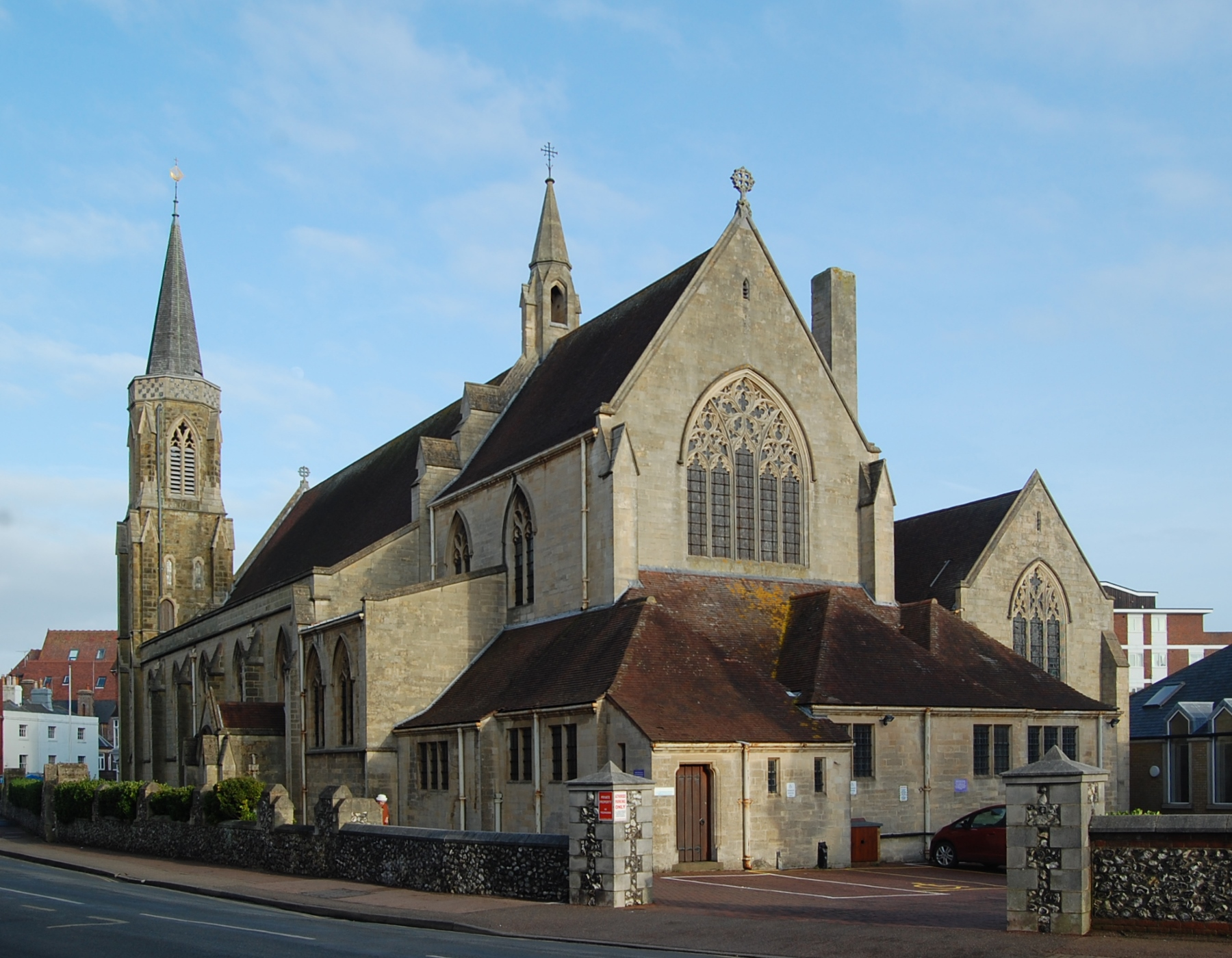
Our Lady of Ransom Church opened in 1901 in the town centre.

After the English Reformation, Roman Catholicism in the Eastbourne area faded away. Censuses in 1603, 1676, 1724 and 1780 recorded no recusants in the area, although a few still lived in nearby villages. The Papists Act 1778 and Roman Catholic Relief Act 1791 removed many restrictions on their worship, education and legal rights. A Mission was set up further along the coast at St Leonards in 1830 by three retired priests, and a permanent priest was put in charge of it in 1841. The Mission was responsible for Roman Catholic worship, pastoral care and administration across a large area of East Sussex, including Eastbourne. By 1862, the priest in charge stated that the town would soon needs its own Mission. Nevertheless, Eastbourne's 19th-century Roman Catholic community developed slowly: in 1867, when Father Charles King moved to the town and started celebrating Mass in his house in Ceylon Place, he said that around five or six worshippers typically attended. (Many coastguards based along the coast and soldiers passing through the town also practised the faith, though, so attendances may often have been higher.) Stella Maris Church on Junction Road, an Early English-style brick structure built in 1868–69 for £450 (£51,000 as of 2023), became the congregation's first permanent place of worship. The Early English-style brick building could hold 100 people, and was well-attended on its official opening day of 1 April 1869. It closed in 1890 and was demolished three years later. In 1890, a former covered market in Grove Road became Eastbourne's new Roman Catholic church, but the building had some structural problems and the arrangement was intended to be temporary while land and funds for a permanent church were sought. This took more than a decade, but a site was bought from the Duke of Devonshire and the first stone of Our Lady of Ransom Church was laid on 12 December 1900. The parish was vast, covering the whole of Eastbourne and extending up to 8 miles (13 km) to Hailsham, Alfriston and Cuckmere Haven, and by the 1950s daughter churches had been established in the east (St Agnes) and northwest (St Gregory) of Eastbourne and at Polegate and Hailsham. Another church was built later in the northern suburb of Hampden Park.

Formal Methodist worship in the Eastbourne area traces its roots to 1810 when a Wesleyan chapel was built on the present Grove Road. This was superseded by another nearby in 1863–64, which was rebuilt in 1907–08 as the Central Methodist Church. Other Wesleyan chapels were opened in the Old Town (1898; later named Greenfield Methodist Church) and the east end of the town (1904). Close to the latter was Beamsley Primitive Methodist Chapel (1886), which was superseded by St Aidan's Church in 1913. Both were provided for Primitive Methodists, a group which united with Wesleyans in 1932 to form the present Methodist Church denomination. A new Methodist church dedicated to St Stephen opened in Hampden Park in 1960, while St Aidan's was closed and demolished in the early 21st century. The Methodist Statistical Returns published in 1947 (Note: The statistical return was compiled between 1940 and 1947 with the aim of documenting all Methodist chapels extant at that time: their location, previous affiliation prior to the Methodist Union of 1932, capacity, building materials and similar details.) recorded the existence of Central, Greenfield and St Aidan's Churches and a chapel of Wesleyan origin in the Willingdon area; all were part of the seven-church Eastbourne Circuit.

The Congregational church held its first services in Eastbourne in 1862, and churches were built on Pevensey Road in 1864 and in Upperton in 1885 (this became the church hall when a larger church was built in 1900–01). Meanwhile, the Presbyterian Church of England opened chapels in the town centre (St Andrew's; 1878) and at Hampden Park (St Luke's; 1913). In 1972 the two denominations came together as the United Reformed Church, of which all four churches became part. Subsequently, Pevensey Road chapel was sold and the proceeds used to build a new joint Baptist, Methodist and United Reformed church in Langney (St Barnabas'; 1975–76), and St Luke's was closed in 2005 and later demolished. Its congregation moved to Hampden Park's Methodist church which now represents both denominations under the name Broadway United Church.

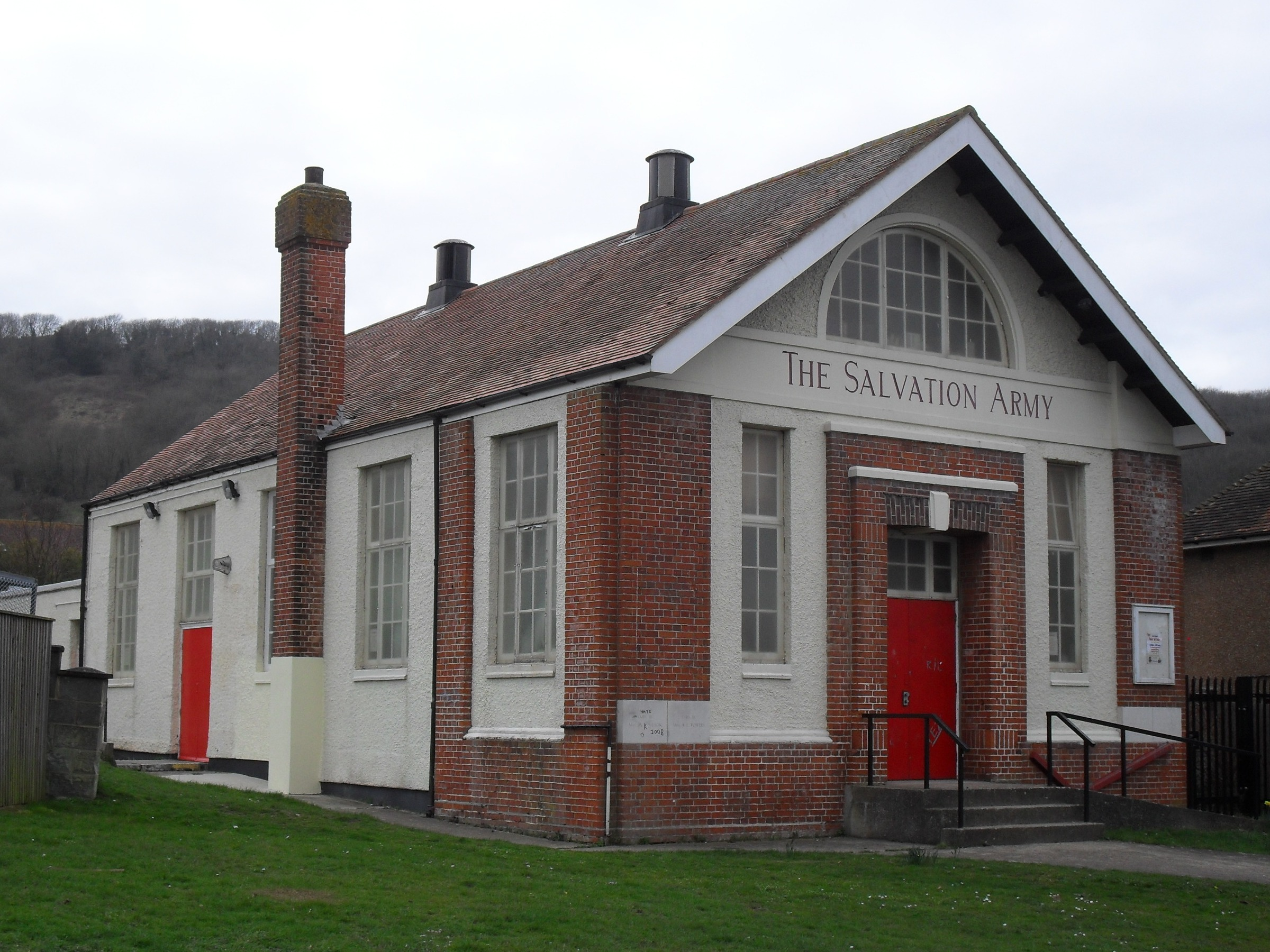
The Salvation Army have a citadel near the town centre and a hall at Downside (pictured).

In 2015, the Methodist and United Reformed Churches announced plans for a merger between four of their congregations—Central and Greenfield Methodist churches and St Andrew's and Upperton United Reformed churches—and the consolidation of worship on the Upperton site, where the 1900–01 chapel and its 1885 predecessor would be demolished and replaced with a new building named Emmanuel Church. (Note: A previous Emmanuel Church (now demolished) in Hyde Road is unrelated. It was initially used for about 30 years from 1880 and was later reregistered for Nonconformist worship between 1930 and 1963.) The other three churches would then close. Planning permission was granted in June 2016 to demolish St Andrew's Church and replace all but the façade with flats. Greenfield Methodist Church's name was changed to Emmanuel and it now holds services for both denominations. The Upperton church remained open for a little longer, offering United Reformed services under the name Upperton with St Andrew's, but demolition work began on 5 August 2019. Central Methodist Church is now occupied by the Church of God Worldwide Mission, a Pentecostal group which had met locally for 20 years but which had no church building of its own. CPL Chartered Architects, who earlier worked on Broadway United Church, were commissioned to design the new combined church, community centre and café on the Upperton Road site and to design new residential buildings for the Greenfield and St Andrew's Church sites, the redevelopment of which will help to fund the new building.

General Baptist worship in Eastbourne can be traced back to 1871, when a tin tabernacle was erected in the town centre. It was replaced by a permanent church, Ceylon Place Baptist Church, in 1885. This was used for the next 120 years, but after it closed the church came close to folding. It was renamed New Hope Church in 2010 and shared premises until a former social club was acquired in 2015 and converted into a dedicated place of worship. The Victoria Baptist Church in the west of town opened in 1973 to replace a chapel established in the Old Town in the 1920s. Strict Baptists have been represented for longer, although the present Grove Road Strict Baptist Church (1881) is not their first building: a predecessor, Marsh Chapel, opened c. 1805. Members of the Salvation Army are catered for by two places of worship: a citadel of 1890 in the east of town, and a hall built in 1927 in the Downside area to the west. Jehovah's Witnesses used part of a building on Susans Road (1946–52) and the first floor of a building on North Street (1955–85) until their new Kingdom Hall in Hampden Park was registered in March of that year. Christian Scientists worshipped in the town centre from the early 20th century until the closure in 2018 of their purpose-built church in Spencers Road. The First Church of Christ, Scientist, Eastbourne was established in 1920 at rooms in Terminus Road but moved in 1922 to its permanent church building, Spencers Hall in Spencers Road. Informal services are now held at a hotel. Another congregation, the Second Church of Christ, Scientist, Eastbourne, occupied rooms on Terminus Road (1932–37) then a building on Bolton Road until it was dissolved in 1961.

== Religious affiliation ==
According to the 2011 United Kingdom Census, 99,412 people lived in Eastbourne. Of these, 59.58% identified themselves as Christian, 1.47% were Muslim, 0.48% were Buddhist, 0.43% were Hindu, 0.21% were Jewish, 0.05% were Sikh, 0.59% followed another religion, 29.17% claimed no religious affiliation and 8% did not state their religion. The proportion of Christians was similar to that of England as a whole (59.38%), while affiliation with Buddhism and faiths in the "any other religion" category was more widespread in Eastbourne: the corresponding figures for England were 0.45% and 0.43% respectively. The proportion of people with no religious affiliation was also higher than the national figure of 24.74%. The other religions had much lower proportions of followers than in England overall: the corresponding national percentages were 5.02% for Islam, 1.52% for Hinduism, 0.79% for Sikhism and 0.49% for Judaism.

== Administration ==
All Anglican churches in the borough of Eastbourne are part of the Diocese of Chichester, whose cathedral is at Chichester in West Sussex. The Rural Deanery of Eastbourne—one of eight deaneries in the Archdeaconry of Lewes and Hastings, which is in turn one of three archdeaconries in the diocese—covers the whole borough and parts of neighbouring districts.

The Roman Catholic Diocese of Arundel and Brighton, whose cathedral is at Arundel, administers Eastbourne's five Roman Catholic churches. Eastbourne and St Leonards-on-Sea Deanery, one of 11 deaneries in the diocese, covers the parish of Eastbourne (a three-church parish consisting of Our Lady of Ransom, St Gregory and St Agnes) and the joint parish of Langney (Christ the King) and Hampden Park (St Joachim).

The Central Sussex United Area, an ecumenical partnership between the Methodist Church and the United Reformed Church's Southern Synod, was formed in September 2007 to administer churches belonging to those denominations in an area bounded by Haywards Heath, Eastbourne and Crowoborough. Within the borough, Broadway United Church at Hampden Park, Emmanuel Church and St Barnabas' United Church in Langney, are part of this area. Also administered by the partnership is The Haven Church—an ecumenical partnership between the Methodist and Anglican churches which meets at a school at Sovereign Harbour.

New Hope and Victoria Baptist Churches and the Baptist congregation at St Barnabas' United Church are administratively part of the East Sussex Network of the South Eastern Baptist Association. Grove Road Strict Baptist Chapel is affiliated with the Gospel Standard movement.

The Church of Jesus Christ of Latter-day Saints in Eastbourne is part of the Crawley Stake. The congregation was constituted as a branch in the 1960s. When the chapel was opened in 2001, the branch became a Ward within the Stake.

== Current places of worship ==
Current places of worship
Name	Image	Location	Denomination/ Affiliation	Grade	Notes	Refs
St Mary the Virgin Church (More images)		Old Town; 50.7727°N 0.2657°E	Anglican	I	A Saxon place of worship dedicated to St Michael was superseded by this flint and stone Norman-era building. Eastbourne's oldest church has nave bays, a chancel arch and arcades dating from about 1200 and a 14th-century exterior. Sedilia, piscina and screens are of the same vintage, and dozens of memorials commemorate important residents.	
All Souls Church (More images)		Eastbourne; 50.7703°N 0.2881°E	Anglican	II*	Alfred Strong's church of 1882 combines the Italianate, Byzantine and Romanesque styles and has a tall campanile and decorative apse. Inside, Byzantine-style capitals top the columns in the arcades. The exterior is of red, white and yellow brick and terracotta. The nave has seven bays, and there are chancel and apse arches.	
Holy Trinity Church (More images)		Eastbourne; 50.7669°N 0.2881°E	Anglican	II*	Between 1837 and 1839, Decimus Burton built a chapel of ease to St Mary the Virgin Church on the road between South Bourne and Seahouses. Aisles and the east end of the chancel were added in 1855 and 1861 respectively. The Early English-style flint church was parished in 1847.	
St Saviour's Church (More images)		Eastbourne; 50.7659°N 0.2829°E	Anglican	II*	George Edmund Street's "noble church" was built on a turnip field granted to the town by the Duke of Devonshire. Founded in 1865, the red brick and ashlar building was completed in 1868. The whole church is tall, but the broach spire—the tallest in Eastbourne, and atop a tower which is barely attached to the north aisle—is the dominant feature. Details include diapering of the nave walls, mosaics and a tiled floor inside.	
All Saints Church (More images)		Eastbourne; 50.7619°N 0.2796°E	Anglican	II	T.E.C. Streatfield built this Gothic Revival church of Kentish ragstone between 1878 and 1880. The foundation stone was laid on 1 November 1877. The nave was destroyed by fire in 1927 and had to be rebuilt. A tower with a cap-style spire stands at the northwest corner.	
Christ Church (More images)		Roselands; 50.7743°N 0.2969°E	Anglican	II	Eastbourne's "fishermen's church" was designed by Benjamin Ferrey in 1859. Early visitors included Princess Alice and Lewis Carroll, who preached there under his real name of Reverend Charles Dodgson. The Gothic Revival flint church was altered in 1870, a chancel was added in 1879, and G.H. Shackle's elaborate war memorial chapel dates from 1922. The tower took nine years to complete.	
St Elisabeth's Church (More images)		Downside; 50.7834°N 0.2547°E	Anglican	II	After the 1930s church was condemned and declared redundant, the congregation moved to the adjacent church hall (built in the Neo-Georgian style at the same time as the old church) and converted it into a place of worship. It opened as a combined church and community centre in July 2004, and structural additions are planned.	
St Mary the Virgin Church (More images)		Hampden Park; 50.7969°N 0.2717°E	Anglican	II	Hampden Park's first church was a chapel of ease to Willingdon, built in a Vernacular style in 1908. The bombed building was replaced by Edward Maufe's simplified Perpendicular Gothic church of 1952–54, which became one of the first postwar buildings to be listed. It has white-painted brickwork, a low tower and a small bell tower.	
St Michael and All Angels Church (More images)		Ocklynge; 50.7784°N 0.2644°E	Anglican	II	G.E.S. Streatfield's large Decorated Gothic church, of flint and with a tower at the west end, is early 20th-century. The chancel, Lady chapel and vestry were built in 1901; a temporary metal structure served as the nave until 1911, when a permanent nave with aisles replaced it. The roof is of slate from Westmorland.	
St Andrew's Church (More images)		Norway; 50.7834°N 0.3045°E	Anglican	–	"Norway Hamlet" in the east end of Eastbourne had no place of worship until a schoolroom was used from October 1881. In 1885, a tin tabernacle previously used by Baptists became available and was re-erected at Norway and dedicated to St Andrew. A permanent church was built by W.H. Murray in 1911–12; the Perpendicular-style red brick and stone structure has an apse and a seven-bay nave.	
St John the Evangelist's Church (More images)		Meads; 50.7580°N 0.2723°E	Anglican	–	The mostly modern appearance of Meads's Anglican church is a result of World War II bombing: all but the tower of H. Ewan Rumble's 1869 Decorated Gothic building was destroyed by Messerschmitt Bf 109s on 4 May 1942. The War Damage Commission funded R. Munch and A. Matthew's rebuilding work of 1955–57, which featured a glazed baptistery. The tower became a free-standing campanile.	
St Peter's Church (More images)		Hydneye; 50.8002°N 0.2834°E	Anglican	–	This combined church and hall, of brick and with a tall roof, was built on the Hydneye estate in the early 1970s to replace the former St Peter's Church in Meads, an 1894 building which became redundant and was demolished in 1971. Some stained glass by Charles Eamer Kempe was retrieved from it and installed in the new church.	
St Philip's Church (More images)		Roselands; 50.7772°N 0.2907°E	Anglican	–	Structural faults in the original church with this dedication, designed by Charles Powell in 1903, caused its demolition in 2004. The church hall was rebuilt for worship in 2006. The Gothic Revival church had yellow and red brickwork and five lancet windows. The present church is part of Christ Church's parish.	
St Richard's Church (More images)		Langney; 50.7957°N 0.3144°E	Anglican	–	Since 1956, the Anglican community in the Langney estate has been served by H. Hubbard Ford and Hugh Wilson's brick hall-style church with later extensions. There are some stained glass windows, and the foundation stone was made of rubble from the demolished St Anne's Church.	
Eastbourne Evangelical Free Church (More images)		Old Town; 50.7724°N 0.2595°E	Evangelical	–	The Victoria Gospel Hall was founded at the bottom of Victoria Drive in the 1920s. The red-brick building was later extended to the west and became an Evangelical church.	
Gateway Christian Church (More images)		Hydneye; 50.8001°N 0.2797°E	Evangelical	–	Frenchgate Chapel was registered for worship by Open Brethren in 1938 and was certified for marriages 30 years later. It later became an Evangelical fellowship and community church. In 2011, the congregation merged with that of Edgmond Church in the Old Town. The original building (click for image) was rebuilt and extended in 2015–16. The united congregation, who adopted the name Gateway Christian Church, worshipped at The Causeway School until the new building (The Gateway Centre) opened in February 2016.	
Kings Church (More images)		Hampden Park; 50.7958°N 0.2866°E	Evangelical	–	This large Evangelical church, part of the Newfrontiers movement, is based in a multipurpose conference centre. It was registered for worship and for marriages in February 1998.	
Living Stones Community Church (More images)		Old Town; 50.7746°N 0.2667°E	Evangelical	–	This Evangelical Christian community worships at Community Wise, a youth and community centre which was built in 1964 by the YWCA. That association sold the building in 2000, and staff and others set up a trust to buy the premises, which were then refurbished.	
Old Town Community Church		Old Town; 50.7801°N 0.2543°E	Evangelical	–	Founded in 1994 as an offshoot of the nearby Living Stones Community Church, this congregation worships in the Old Town Community Centre on Central Drive. The church is a member of the Evangelical Alliance.	
St Anthony's Centre (More images)		St Anthony's Hill; 50.7890°N 0.3101°E	Evangelical	–	This combined worship and community building was opened in September 2006 by the Eastbourne Community Church, which also uses the Bridgemere Centre on the Bridgemere housing estate. The congregation was founded in 1990 and merged with the former St Anthony's Church in 2004. The latter had been based in the present building, which was registered for marriages in April 1937 under the name St Anthony's Hall.	
Our Lady of Ransom Church (More images)		Eastbourne; 50.7661°N 0.2778°E	Roman Catholic	II	Frederick Walters designed this Roman Catholic church in the Decorated Gothic style in 1900–01. The Bath stone and ashlar exterior conceals an impressively elaborate interior. Additions included a tower with a steeple in 1912, additional chapels in 1920 and a baptistery in 1967 (by architect A.J. McDonough). The church replaced the earlier Stella Maris Chapel on Terminus Road.	
Christ the King Church (More images)		Langney; 50.7924°N 0.3148°E	Roman Catholic	–	Mass was celebrated in Langney Village Hall by the priest from St Agnes' Church from 1959 until 1967, when Henry Bingham Towner designed and built a permanent church. The low Modernist building is of local dark brick and concrete. It was registered for worship in June 1968 and for marriages two months later.	
St Agnes' Church (More images)		Roselands; 50.7774°N 0.2968°E	Roman Catholic	–	P.D. Stonham's Early English red-brick and stone building was founded in September 1906 and opened six months later. The church was parished between 1957, when it was split from Our Lady of Ransom, and 1999, and was registered for marriages in June 1958. Mass centres served from St Agnes (later replaced by permanent churches) opened at Langney and Pevensey Bay in 1959.	
St Gregory's Church (More images)		Downside; 50.7825°N 0.2541°E	Roman Catholic	–	The dedication of McDonough and Robins's 1965 Modernist church recalls the ancient chantry chapel of St Gregory in Meads, first documented in 1239 and now lost. The yellow brick and concrete building, with a prominent circular baptistery of glass and flint, cost £43,000 and replaced the adjacent timber hut used for Masses since 1934. English Heritage called it a "bold modern design". It was registered for worship and for marriages in January 1967.	
St Joachim's Church (More images)		Hampden Park; 50.8008°N 0.2773°E	Roman Catholic	–	Hampden Park's Roman Catholics worshipped at St Gregory's Church or at Polegate until the latter's priest paid £3,632 for land on Broderick Road and founded a church there. Built between June 1959 and April 1960 and parished from June 1960, the church was reunited with Polegate's parish in 1999. It was registered for worship and for marriages in March 1960.	
New Hope Baptist Church (More images)		Roselands; 50.7780°N 0.3003°E	Baptist	–	The congregation of the former Ceylon Place Baptist Church bought a new building in 2015, converted it into a chapel and registered it for worship in 2016. The name New Hope had been adopted in 2010 when the church was without a home. The building on Beach Road was opened in 1951 as the Royal Naval Old Comrades club, an association founded four years earlier. It closed in late 2014.	
Victoria Baptist Church (More images)		Downside; 50.7798°N 0.2604°E	Baptist	–	Baptist worship in Eastbourne was established in 1870 by Charles Spurgeon, a church was founded at Ceylon Place in 1871, and a second was built in the Old Town in 1925–26. A 1.5-acre (0.61 ha) site on Eldon Road was bought in 1960, and a new 560-capacity church (square, with a lantern-style spire) opened on 23 June 1973. It was registered for worship and for marriages later that month, replacing the earlier chapel in the Old Town.	
Emmanuel Church (Greenfield Methodist Church) (More images)		Old Town; 50.7728°N 0.2620°E	Methodist/United Reformed Church	–	This 1898 church (with later extensions) was originally built for the Wesleyan Methodist community in the Old Town. It is an Early English Gothic Revival-style red-brick chapel with stone drip-moulds. Until the new Emmanuel Church building opens on Upperton Road at the conclusion of the project to consolidate Methodist and United Reformed worship on to one site, services are held here and the chapel has taken the Emmanuel name. When registered for marriages in November 1925 it had the name Wesleyan Methodist School Chapel.	
Broadway United Church (More images)		Hampden Park; 50.7993°N 0.2658°E	Methodist/United Reformed Church	–	The Methodist community's former St Stephen's Church is now united with Hampden Park's United Reformed Church community, whose St Luke's Church has been demolished. The new name, adopted in 2005, reflects this union. The red-brick building dates from 1960 and was registered for worship (as St Stephen's Methodist Church) in June of that year. A marriage licence followed two months later. When the two congregations united, CPL Chartered Architects (Church Projects Ltd) of Polegate were commissioned to make internal alterations and build additional rooms.	
Salvation Army Hall, Eastbourne Citadel Corp (More images)		Eastbourne; 50.7714°N 0.2926°E	Salvation Army	–	Anti-Salvation Army feeling in the late 19th century, when the group founded their citadel in Langney Road, culminated in disturbances involving thousands of residents and the formation of the town's police force. J.W. Durnford designed the red-brick building, with its distinctive painted battlements, in 1890. It was registered for marriages in February 1916.	
Salvation Army Hall, Eastbourne Old Town Corp (More images)		Downside; 50.7797°N 0.2501°E	Salvation Army	–	Eastbourne Old Town Corp opened up on 23 June 1927 in the Crown Street Hall (no longer extant) in the Old Town. They then moved to the present site, which serves the west side of the town. The building was registered for marriages in February 1936. This red-brick hall has always been used for Salvation Army worship.	
St Barnabas United Church (More images)		Langney; 50.8028°N 0.3019°E	Baptist/Methodist/United Reformed Church	–	This was built in 1975–76 to serve the rapidly growing population of the Langney estate. Money came from an anonymous donor and the sale of a dilapidated former Congregational church of 1862 in Pevensey Road—part of town which had lost its residential character. The new church was registered for worship and for marriages with the name St Barnabas United Church and Christian Centre in July 1976.	
South Street Free Church (More images)		Eastbourne; 50.7666°N 0.2795°E	Countess of Huntingdon's Connexion	II	Henry Ward's Congregational church of 1903 now has an Evangelical congregation which is part of the Countess of Huntingdon's Connexion denomination. The church, of red brick with stone banding and dressings, was listed by English Heritage in May 2009. The "Free Gothic"-style structure stands on the site of a blacksmith's forge. In 1908, a local undertakers firm built their premises in a similar style adjoining the church's west wall. The chapel was registered for marriages in December 1904.	
Elim Family Church (More images)		Upperton; 50.7714°N 0.2770°E	Elim Foursquare Gospel Alliance	–	The Elim Pentecostal church is now based in a complex of retirement flats on the site of the original church—a painted brick building with a gabled roof and a pediment over the entrance. The 1929 building was demolished in 2006–2007, and the flats (owned by the church) and a nursery school were built above a 230-capacity worship space between 2007 and 2008. The new church was registered for marriages in February 2014.	
St Panteleimon and St Theodore Church (More images)		Eastbourne; 50.7689°N 0.2912°E	Greek Orthodox	–	Cavendish Place Calvinistic Independent Chapel, founded by a local farmer, was opened in 1857 to replace a converted stable used for worship by Calvinists since 1823. It closed in 1985, and in 1990 the Gothic-style building was sold to the Greek Orthodox Church. The exterior is rendered.	
Suncoast Church (More images)		Eastbourne; 50.7782°N 0.2884°E	International Network of Churches	–	This congregation is part of the evangelical International Network of Churches movement (previously called Christian Outreach Centre). It is based in a building in the Courtlands Road industrial area. Previously, a building at Kilburn Terrace had been registered for worship and marriages from July 1996.	
Kingdom Hall (More images)		Hampden Park; 50.8016°N 0.2770°E	Jehovah's Witnesses	–	This building on Brodrick Road was registered for worship and for marriages in March 1985 and is used by three Eastbourne-based Congregations of Jehovah's Witnesses: Hampden Park, Old Town and Seaside.	
Eastbourne Hebrew Congregation Synagogue (More images)		Eastbourne; 50.7694°N 0.2883°E	Jewish (Orthodox)	–	This synagogue is based in Susans Road in the town centre. The premises were enlarged in 2001. Provision for Jewish burials is also made at the Eastbourne Borough Cemetery, where an area has been set aside.	
Church of Jesus Christ of Latter-day Saints, Eastbourne Ward Meetinghouse (More images)		Eastbourne; 50.7658°N 0.2798°E	Latter-day Saint	–	A branch was founded for Eastbourne's Latter-day Saint followers in 1968, although worship had taken place since the late 1950s. Various halls, houses and hotels were used, and worshippers also travelled to Brighton or Hastings. A former theological college, built in 1874, was bought in 2000 and became a meetinghouse in October 2001, when Eastbourne Ward was formed.	
Eastbourne Islamic Cultural Centre and Mosque (More images)		Eastbourne; 50.7727°N 0.2869°E	Muslim	–	The original mosque on the site, a long single-storey building (click for image), was built as an office in 1949. Four years later, SEEBOARD turned it into a social club for its employees. Eastbourne's Muslim community acquired it in 1995 and it became a 50-capacity mosque and social centre. Planning permission for a new 300-capacity two-storey mosque was refused in 2004, but a later application for a replacement three-storey building was approved in 2013. The new mosque was finished in 2018.	
Speak Life Centre (Eastbourne Christian Prayer Centre) (More images)		Eastbourne; 50.7677°N 0.2877°E	Non-denominational	–	Speak Life (formerly Revival)—a non-denominational, evangelical-based Christian media group founded in 1952 as The Hour of Revival—operate from this small red-brick town-centre building. It is used as a place of worship and meditation, drop-in centre, prayer ministry, broadcasting centre and a recording studio. The building was registered for worship as the Lismore Road Room between 1933 and 1967.	
Marine Hall (More images)		Eastbourne; 50.7722°N 0.2954°E	Open Brethren	–	Marine Hall was built on Seaside in 1893 for an assembly of Open Brethren who had previously worshipped elsewhere in the town. The congregation moved to a meeting room on Longstone Road in 1912 and registered it (again as Marine Hall) in September 1913, but in October 1951 the original building was re-registered in its place and has remained in use ever since.	
Deliverance Centre Eastbourne at Central Methodist Church (More images)		Eastbourne; 50.7689°N 0.2888°E	Pentecostal	II	Unusually for an early 20th-century Nonconformist church, Carlos Crisford's 1907–08 building is in the Decorated Gothic style and has a steeple. It replaced a similar building of 1863–64 on the same site, which had succeeded a chapel founded in 1809 in Grove Road. The new church, which was built with attached schoolrooms (still extant on the Langney Road façade), was built as Eastbourne's central meeting place for Wesleyan Methodists, and remained in Methodist use until the advent of the Emmanuel Church project to consolidate Methodist and United Reformed worship on to one site. It closed in 2018 and was sold to the Church of God Worldwide Mission, a Pentecostal group who had been sharing the premises.	
Friends Meeting House (More images)		Eastbourne; 50.7654°N 0.2844°E	Quaker	–	Eastbourne's Quaker community have worshipped since 1939 in a town-centre meeting house which had to be rebuilt after wartime bomb damage, giving it its present plain appearance. Architect H. Hubbard Ford was responsible both for the initial conversion and for the postwar redesign. The 90-capacity premises, which were converted from a Victorian cottage and a former stable, are made available to other organisations as well.	
Eastbourne Christian Spiritualist Church (More images)		Eastbourne; 50.7727°N 0.2892°E	Spiritualist	–	Part of a building on Cavendish Avenue has been registered for Spiritualist services since November 1957. It has also been licensed for the solemnisation of marriages since June 1982. The church replaced a place of worship registered as The Sanctuary between 1950 and 1957, which occupied rooms on Susans Road; this had in turn succeeded a church registered in part of a building on Terminus Road in 1943.	
Grove Road Strict Baptist Church (More images)		Eastbourne; 50.7680°N 0.2796°E	Strict Baptist	–	The first Strict Baptist place of worship, Marsh Chapel, was founded in the first few years of the 19th century. A new chapel was founded on South Street in 1853, and this was in turn replaced by architect J.J. Skinner's red brick and stone chapel. Land had been bought the year before, and the total cost of the site and construction was £4,000. The chapel registered for marriages in January 1882. Wartime bomb damage took until 1950 to repair, and further reordering was carried out inside in 2002. The church is aligned with the Gospel Standard movement.	

== Former places of worship ==
Former places of worship
Name	Image	Location	Denomination/ Affiliation	Grade	Notes	Refs
Beamsley Wesleyan Chapel (More images)		Eastbourne; 50.7767°N 0.2987°E	Methodist	–	This combined church and school was in use by Wesleyan Methodists for less than 20 years: it was built in 1886 and sold to Christ Church in 1904. It is no longer in religious use. The school was in the basement of the red-brick Gothic Revival building, which is now painted over.	
Wish Hill Methodist Church (More images)		Lower Willingdon; 50.7965°N 0.2527°E	Methodist	–	This building is now used as the headquarters of the Beachy Head Chaplaincy, whose volunteers patrol the cliffs at the infamous suicide location and offer support and counselling. It was built as a Wesleyan chapel and had a capacity of 100 worshippers.	
St Elisabeth's Church (original building) (More images)		Downside; 50.7831°N 0.2549°E	Anglican	II	Peter Dulvey Stonham's gigantic unadorned Gothic red-brick church was founded in 1935 and consecrated on 19 February 1938. Eastbourne was well provided with Anglican churches, but the will of its reclusive donor stipulated her £80,000 had to be spent in the town—so the diocese's desire to build new churches in Brighton with the legacy was unfulfilled. Design faults in the construction of walls and roof affected the structural integrity, and the church has been declared redundant. The adjacent parish hall is now used for worship.	
Ceylon Place Baptist Church (More images)		Eastbourne; 50.7696°N 0.2919°E	Baptist	–	The first church on the site, an iron chapel erected in 1871 and registered for marriages (under the name Baptist Tabernacle) in April 1876, was given to the Anglican community in 1885 when John Wills designed a permanent replacement. The brick and Bath Stone Early English-style church has a corner tower. World War II bomb damage closed it for five years; it reopened in 1948, but was sold in 2005 for conversion into flats. The congregation moved to Central Methodist Church and then in 2015 to their new church, New Hope Baptist Church on Beach Road.	
First Church of Christ, Scientist, Eastbourne (More images)		Eastbourne; 50.7657°N 0.2820°E	Christian Scientist	–	This church has stood on Spencer Road opposite St Saviour's Church since 1922, but its present appearance is attributable to local architectural firm Benz and Williams's refurbishment of 1975–79. It is built on to the side of the neighbouring house. The church was put up for sale in 2018.	
Edgmond Evangelical Church (More images)		Old Town; 50.7722°N 0.2641°E	Evangelical	–	Edgmond Hall was built as Eastbourne's excise office in about 1840, but was converted to an Open Brethren church in 1872 by William Brodie. The stucco-faced Neoclassical building was extended and taken over by an Evangelical congregation in 1993, but they sold it in 2011 and merged with the Frenchgate church on the Hydneye estate. The building was converted by CPL Chartered Architects to create premises for The JPK Project—an independent living scheme for people with learning disabilities. Planning permission was granted after being rejected in 2013.	
Bourne Hall (More images)		Eastbourne; 50.7701°N 0.2926°E	Plymouth Brethren	–	This small building, on Bourne Street in central Eastbourne, was registered in the late 1930s by town's Plymouth Brethren community. Since it was sold it has housed a company offering private tuition and a textiles tuition studio.	
St Gregory's Church (original building)		Downside; 50.7827°N 0.2541°E	Roman Catholic	–	The first Roman Catholic place of worship in the northwest suburbs of Eastbourne was this small painted wooden chapel, built for £1,000 in 1934. The new St Gregory's Church was built on adjacent land in 1965, and the timber building became a hall and later a Montessori nursery school.	
St Andrew's Church (More images)		Eastbourne; 50.7649°N 0.2846°E	United Reformed Church	–	F.J. Barker designed this church in 1878 for the Presbyterian community, and it later became part of the United Reformed Church. The cruciform Early English-style red-brick building has good interior decoration, and exterior embellishments include a flèche. Schoolrooms were added to the east in 1912. The church closed as part of the Emmanuel Church project, and there are plans to demolish it in favour of housing. Its marriage registration was cancelled in March 2016.	

== See also ==
- Media related to Places of worship in Eastbourne at Wikimedia Commons
- List of demolished places of worship in East Sussex

== Bibliography ==
- Anon. (2002). A Brief History of Crawley England Stake in Celebration of the Stake's 25th "Silver Jubilee" Anniversary 1977–2002. The Church of Jesus Christ of Latter-day Saints (Crawley England Stake).
- Antram, Nicholas; Pevsner, Nikolaus (2013). Sussex: East with Brighton and Hove. The Buildings of England. London: Yale University Press. ISBN 978-0-300-18473-0.
- Beevers, David; Marks, Richard; Roles, John (1989). Sussex Churches and Chapels. Brighton: The Royal Pavilion, Art Gallery and Museums. ISBN 0-948723-11-4.
- Berry, Patricia; Gordon, Kevin (1996). Britain in Old Photographs: Around Eastbourne. Stroud: Sutton Publishing. ISBN 0-7509-1272-3.
- Carder, Timothy (1990). The Encyclopaedia of Brighton. Lewes: East Sussex County Libraries. ISBN 0-86147-315-9.
- Chambers, Ralph (1953). The Strict Baptist Chapels of England: Sussex. Vol. 2. Thornton Heath: Ralph Chambers.
- Doring, Ian (1986). A History of Victoria Baptist Church Eastbourne. Eastbourne: Victoria Baptist Church.
- Dunn Wilson, David (1978). From Seahouses to Central: A Short Account of "The People Called Methodists" in Eastbourne (Lecture). Eastbourne: D. Dunn Wilson.
- Dyer, Enid (1985). The History of Upperton Church. Eastbourne: Upperton United Reformed Church.
- Elleray, D. Robert (1978). Eastbourne: A Pictorial History. Chichester: Phillimore & Co. ISBN 0-85033-964-2.
- Elleray, D. Robert (2004). Sussex Places of Worship. Worthing: Optimus Books. ISBN 0-9533132-7-1.
- Kennedy, Joan (2001). Our Lady of Ransom, in Gratitude and Hope. Eastbourne: Our Lady of Ransom Catholic Church.
- Levy, Elkan D.; Taylor, Derek (eds.) (2010). The Jewish Year Book 2010. Edgware: Vallentine Mitchell. ISBN 978-0-85303-901-3.
- Methodist Church of Great Britain (1947). Methodist Church Buildings: Statistical Returns including Seating Accommodation as at July 1st, 1940 (PDF). Manchester: The Department for Chapel Affairs. (Available online in 14 parts; Guide to abbreviations on page 6)
- Nairn, Ian; Pevsner, Nikolaus (1965). The Buildings of England: Sussex. Harmondsworth: Penguin Books. ISBN 0-14-071028-0.
- Salter, Mike (2000). The Old Parish Churches of Sussex. Malvern: Folly Publications. ISBN 1-871731-40-2.
- Stoner, Peter; Hollands, John (2002). St Andrew's Church & Parish: the Origins and History (as researched by the late Gordon Stoner and published in St Andrew's Parish Magazine). Eastbourne: Peter Stoner and John Hollands.
- Surtees, John (2002). Eastbourne: a History. Chichester: Phillimore & Co. ISBN 1-86077-226-9.
- Surtees, John (2005). Eastbourne's Story. Seaford: S.B. Publications. ISBN 1-85770-298-0.
- Surtees, John; Taylor, Nicholas R. (2005). Images of England: Eastbourne. Stroud: Tempus Publishing. ISBN 0-7524-3682-1.
- The Diocese of Arundel & Brighton (2020). Diocese of Arundel & Brighton Catholic Directory 2020. Purley: Roman Catholic Diocese of Arundel and Brighton.
- Vickers, John A., ed. (1989). The Religious Census of Sussex 1851. Lewes: Sussex Record Society. ISBN 085445-036-X.
- Watney, Simon (2007). 20 Sussex Churches. Alfriston: Snake River Press. ISBN 978-1-906022-00-6.
- Whiteman, Ken; Whiteman, Joyce (1998). Ancient Churches of Sussex. Seaford: S.B. Publications. ISBN 1-85770-154-2.
- Wilton, John (1999). Eastbourne Then and Now. Seaford: S.B. Publications. ISBN 1-85770-176-3.
