= Hans Feibusch =

German artist

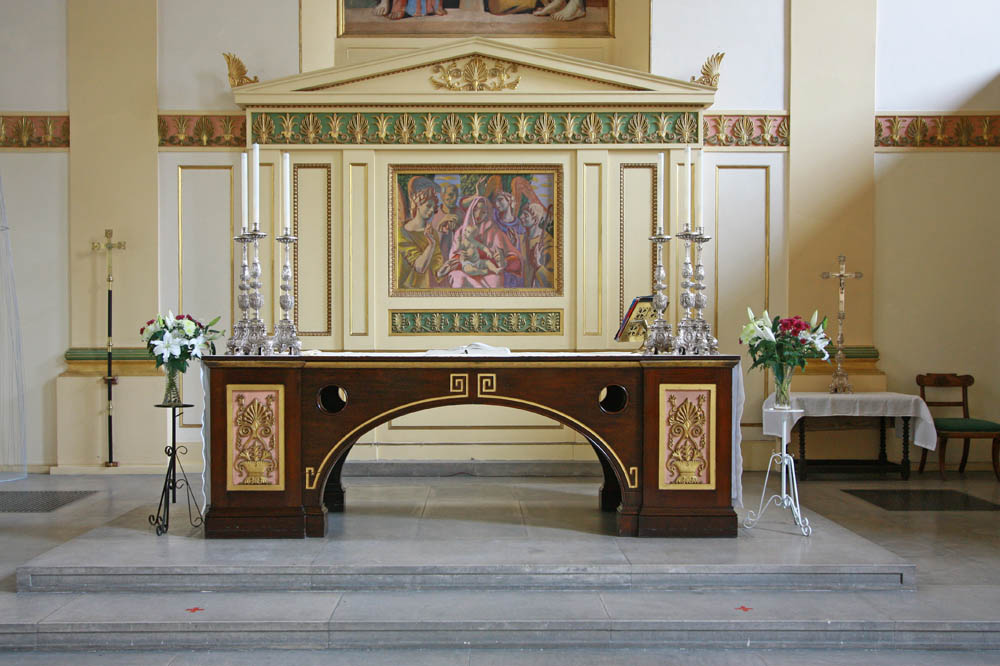
Altarpiece at St John's Church, Waterloo

Hans Nathan Feibusch (15 August 1898 – 18 July 1998) was a German painter and sculptor of Jewish heritage who lived and worked in Britain from 1933 until his death. He is best known for his murals, particularly in Anglican churches. In all he worked in thirty Anglican churches (28 as a muralist, and two—including Ely Cathedral—as sculptor only) and produced what is probably the largest body of work in his particular métier by any artist in the history of the Church of England.

== Early life in Germany ==
Feibusch was born in Frankfurt am Main, Germany to Jewish parents. His father was a dental surgeon and his mother was an amateur painter. He served with the German Army on the Russian front during the First World War, from 1916 to 1918.

After the war he studied art in Munich. Subsequently, he worked under Karl Hofer at the Berlin University of the Arts, and then in Paris with Andre Lhote. He returned to Frankfurt in 1925 to work as an artist, with a studio in the former Carmelite convent alongside Rudolf Heinisch and Benno Elkan. He was awarded a prize by the Prussian Academy of Arts in 1931 for his painting The Fishmonger.

After the Nazi Party came to power, he emigrated to England in 1933. His works were subsequently exhibited in the 1937 exhibition of Entartete Kunst (Degenerate Art). Feibusch was one of a minority of artists included whose work was relatively conservative, and he was probably included for his Jewish heritage. His works in that exhibition, now lost, were two paintings of angels. His work Zwei schwebende Figuren (Two floating figures), confiscated from the Städtischen Galerie in Frankfurt, was displayed with works by Jankel Adler and Marc Chagall as part of the exhibition entitled Offenbarung der jüdischen Rassenseele gezeigt (Revelation of the Jewish racial soul).

== Life in England ==
Feibusch joined the London Group of artists in 1934 and the following year he married Sidonie Cramer, a daughter of David Gestetner and the divorced wife of Max Cramer.

He swore an oath of allegiance to the British Crown in 1940. He first exhibited work at the Royal Academy summer exhibition in 1944.

After the war, he became known for his church murals, working on around separate 30 churches. He converted to Christianity and was baptized and confirmed into the Church of England in 1965. He worshipped at the church of St Alban the Martyr, Holborn, where he painted his largest mural.

Feibusch wrote a book Mural Painting, published in 1946, and published in a number of journals about mural painting. A celebration of his life work was held by the Twentieth Century Society in 1993, which was the first event of a reappraisal of his work.

He was awarded the Officer's Cross of the Order of Merit of the Federal Republic of Germany (Verdienstkreuz 1. Klasse) in 1967, and advanced to the Commander's Cross or Great Cross of Merit (Großes Verdienstkreuz) in 1989.

Feibusch died four weeks short of his 100th birthday, just after attending a celebration of his work and life held at the Royal College of Art. His estate bequeathed the entire contents of his studio at the time of his death to the Pallant House Gallery in Chichester. He died at the Royal Free Hospital in Camden, London. In the last years of his life he reverted to the Jewish faith of his youth and was buried with Jewish liturgy at Golders Green Jewish Cemetery.

== Work in England and Wales ==
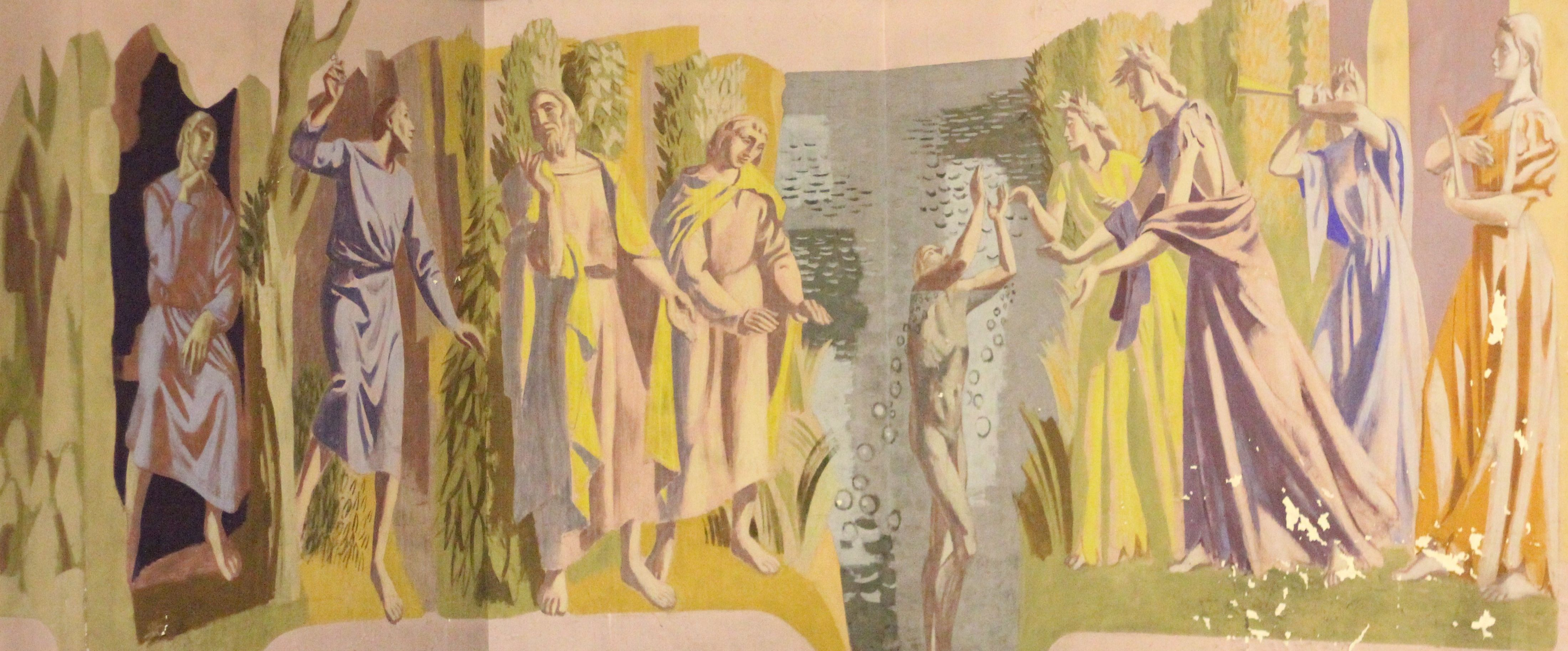
Pilgrim's Progress (1944) formerly at St Elisabeth's Church, Eastbourne

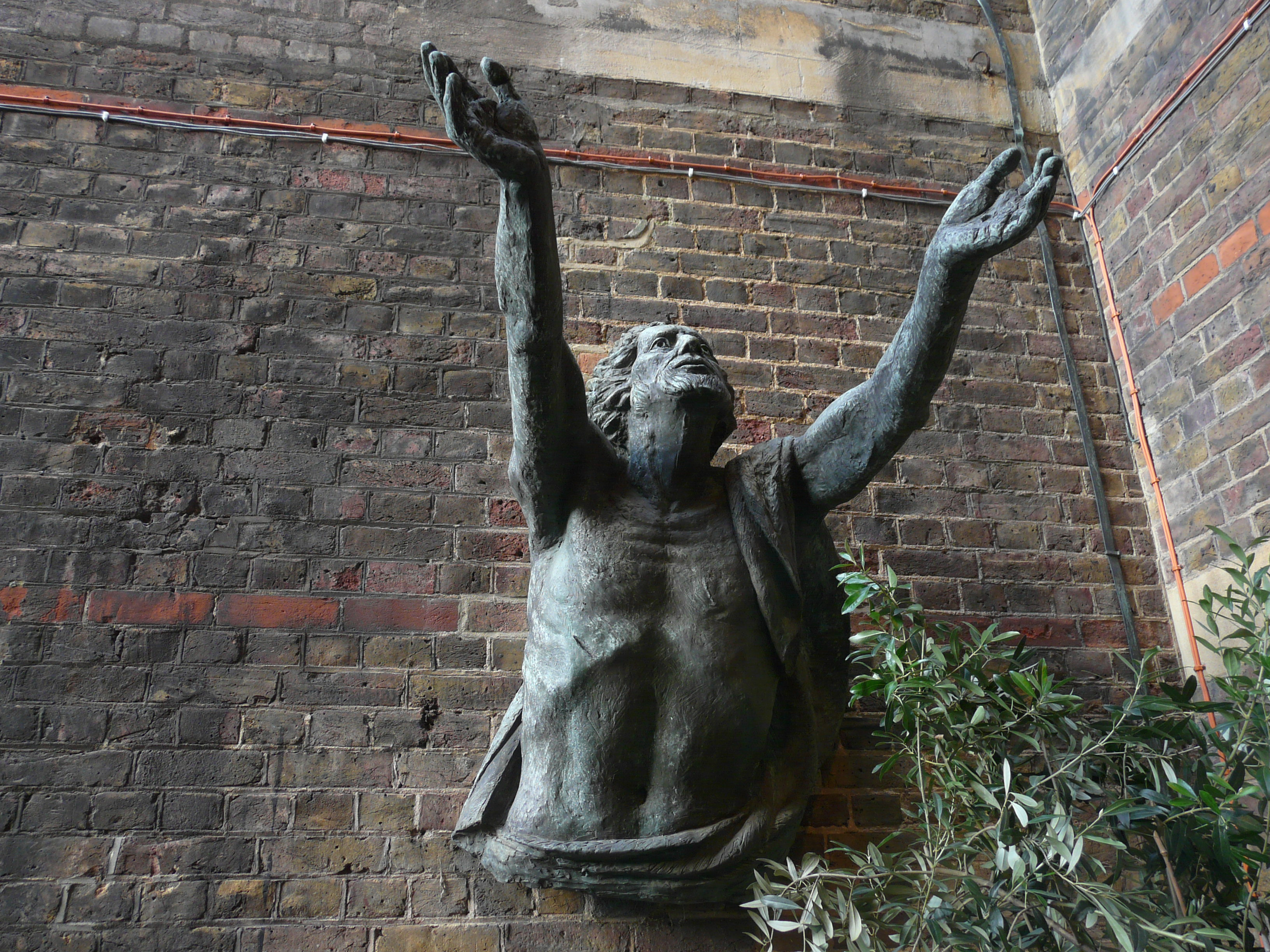
Jesus Being Raised From the Dead, St Alban the Martyr, Holborn

Feibusch's work was always representational but he developed early on an Expressionist use of colour and intensity of vision. Feibusch used colour to accentuate intent and meaning. The composition, often of closely grouped figures, are neo-classical in their arrangement and mannered poses.

His first public mural in England was The Footwashing, for the New Methodist Hall in Colliers Wood, a commissioned by Edward D. Mills in 1937. He was befriended by George Bell, Bishop of Chichester, whose influence caused him to receive the first of his church commissions for murals on religious themes. Among the first of these is the mural in the bishop's private chapel in the episcopal palace in Chichester. This made use of the medieval wall already existing at the chapel's west end, containing blocked windows. Feibusch depicted people looking out of the windows. Many though not all of his murals are in the Diocese of Chichester, including a Pilgrim's Progress at St Elisabeth's Eastbourne (now in storage), Christ in Majesty at St Mary's Church, Goring-by-Sea, the Prodigal Son in All Saints, Iden, East Sussex, and St John Baptising Christ in the baptistery at Chichester Cathedral, a nativity cycle at St Wilfrid's Church, Brighton. Others works are at churches in Coventry, Wellingborough, Preston, Paulsgrove, and Exeter; Christchurch Priory in Dorset; and others at St Ethelburga's Bishopsgate, St Alban the Martyr, Holborn and Holy Trinity Church, Rotherhithe in London. He created a mural of the Trinity in Glory for St Alban the Martyr, Holborn, in 1966, his largest single work, together with fourteen Stations of the Cross and a bronze figure of Christ for the outer wall of the church. Another large work in London is the Adoration of the Cross at St Michael and All Angels in Harrow. He painted a mural of the crucifixion at St Martin's Church in Dagenham and more work is found in London at St John's Church, Waterloo.

A mural in the apse was painted at St Barnabas, Eltham themed on 'Christ ascended in glory'. The church had been destroyed in June 1944 and rebuilt in the 1950s with an altered interior. Feibusch's artwork was created after the remodelled interior was installed with a linear feature in the nave surmounted by angels. This was one of six that Feibusch painted as acts of reconciliation. He spoke of how he had come to know the church while taking a bus to work in Lewisham during the Second World War.

For nearly forty years the artist Phyllis Bray collaborated with Feibusch on producing his church murals.

He also produced non-religious work at the village of Portmeirion in Wales as a result of his friendship with Clough Williams-Ellis, and his portrait of Williams-Ellis is held in the National Portrait Gallery. He also decorated civic buildings in Dudley and Newport. A series of twelve murals by Feibusch and Bray, each over 20 feet (6.1 m), around the central hall of Newport Civic Centre, tell the history of Newport. They were commissioned by Newport Corporation in 1960 and painted during the period 1961–1964. The Dolman Theatre in Newport houses a mural of an early travelling theatre painted by Feibusch in 1967.
