= Ernest William Tristram =

Welsh artist (1882–1952)

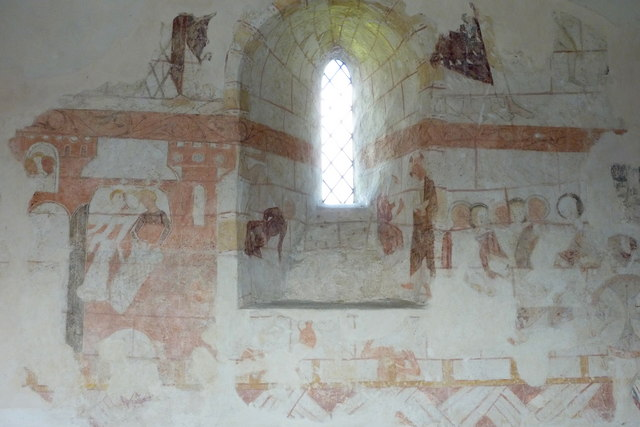
- Medieval wall paintings uncovered by Tristram in 1927
- Born: 1882; Carmarthen, Wales
- Died: 1952 (aged 69–70); Newton Abbot, England
- Education: Carmarthen Grammar School; Royal College of Art
- Known for: English Medieval Wall Painting (3 vols., 1944–1955)
- Scientific career
- Fields: Art History, Conservation
- Workplaces: Royal College of Art

Ernest William Tristram (1882–1952) was a British art historian, artist and conservator, and Professor of Design at the Royal College of Art (1926–1948).

== Life ==
Tristram was born in Carmarthen, the son of Francis William Tristram, a railway inspector, and Sarah Harverson. After leaving Carmarthen Grammar School he studied at the Royal College of Art. In 1906 he joined the teaching staff, becoming professor of design in 1926.

He published on English medieval wall painting, and worked on the conservation of medieval murals with mixed results. He also wrote on the conservation of medieval monuments for The Times and the Burlington Magazine. His conservation included work on King Edward's Chair (the coronation chair) in Westminster Abbey. Although best known for his cataloguing and watercolours of existing church murals, Tristram also painted original works. These include chancel wall panels for St Elisabeth's Eastbourne, depicting St John the Baptist and his parents, as well as paintings at York Minster and Saint Fin Barre's Cathedral in Cork City, Ireland.

He retired in 1948 and died in a nursing home in Newton Abbot in 1952.

== Publications ==
- English Medieval Wall Painting. The Twelfth Century (Oxford University Press, 1944)
- English Medieval Wall Painting. The Thirteenth Century (Oxford University Press, 1950)
- English Wall Painting of the Fourteenth Century (Routledge & Paul, 1955) – posthumous
