= Grove Road Strict Baptist Church =

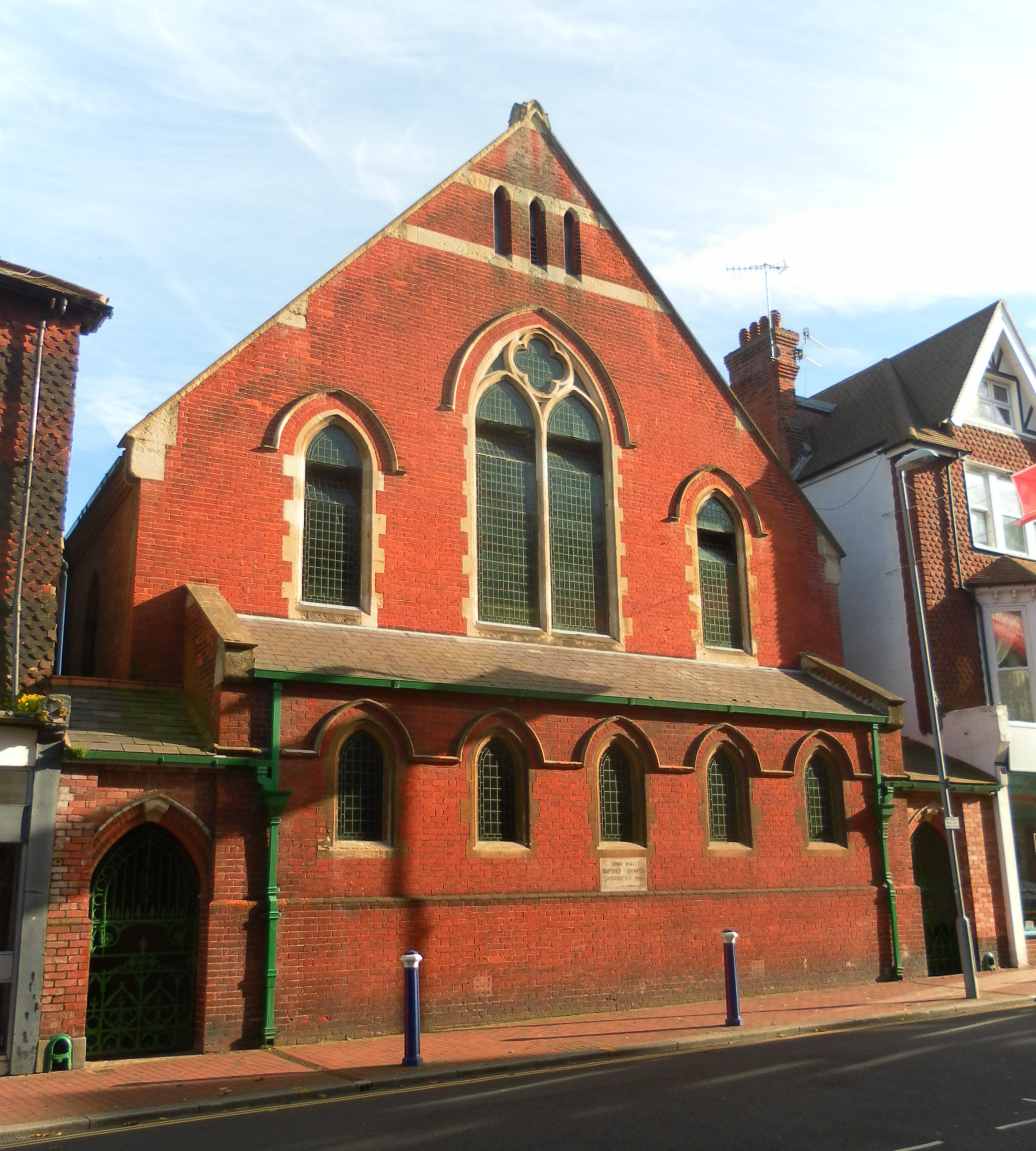
- The chapel from the west
- Grove Road Strict Baptist Church
- 50.7680°N 0.2796°E
- Location: Eastbourne
- Country: England
- Denomination: Baptist

History
- Status: chapel
- Founded: 1881

Architecture
- Completed: 1881

The Grove Road Strict Baptist Church, is a Strict Baptist place of worship in the town of Eastbourne in the English county of East Sussex. The chapel was built in 1881.

J.J. Skinner's 1881 red brick and stone chapel replaced an earlier Strict Baptist place of worship, Marsh Chapel, which was founded in the first few years of the 19th century. Reordering was carried out inside in 2002. The church is aligned with the Gospel Standard movement.

The church was licensed for worship in accordance with the Places of Worship Registration Act 1855 and was given the registration number 25941.

== See also ==
- List of places of worship in Eastbourne
- List of Strict Baptist churches
