= St Mary's Church, Hampden Park, Eastbourne =

St Mary's Church
- St Mary the Virgin Church
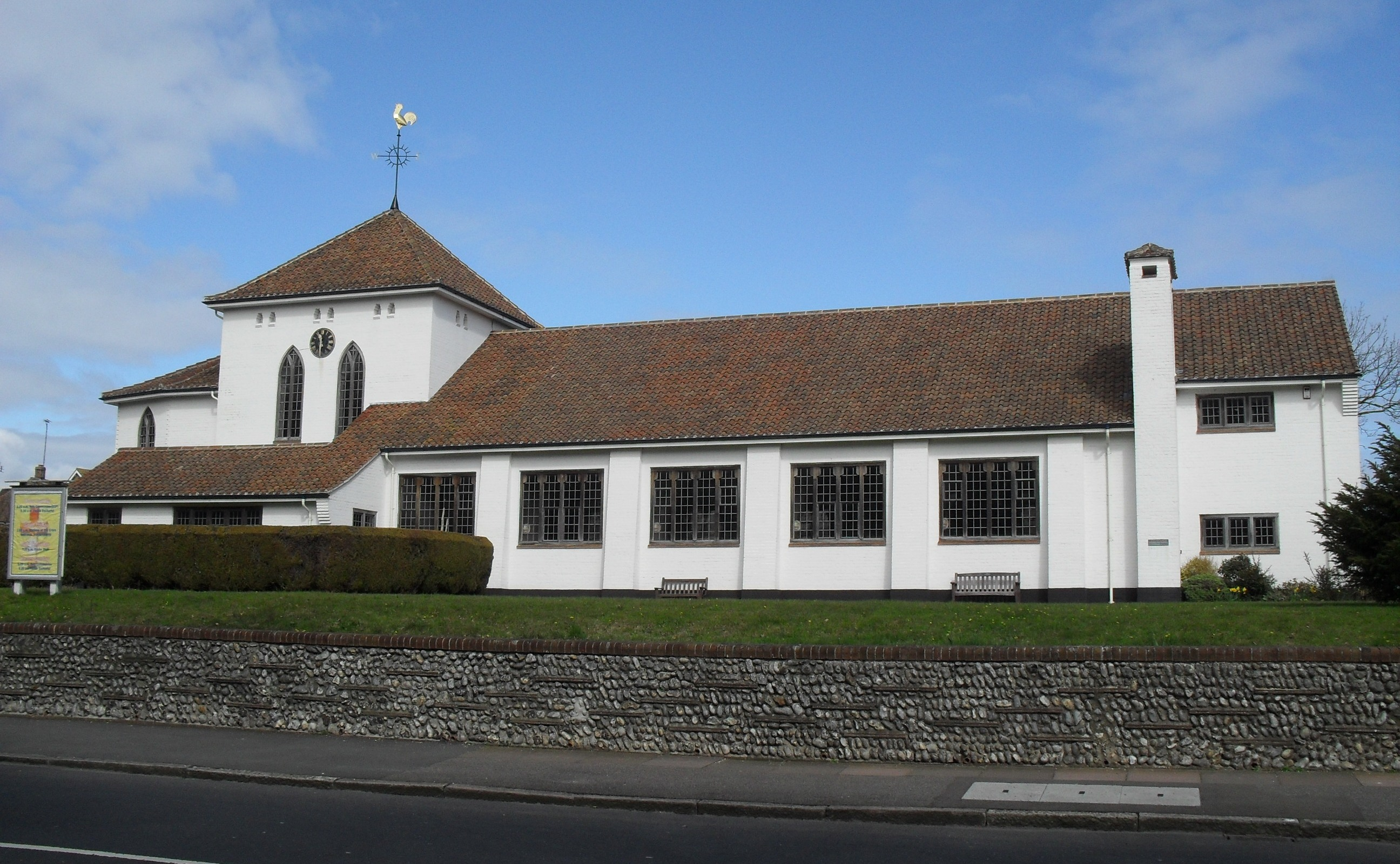
- The church from the south

- 50.7969°N 0.2717°E
- Location: Decoy Drive, Hampden Park, Eastbourne, East Sussex BN22 9PP
- Country: England
- Denomination: Anglican
- Churchmanship: Modern Catholic

History
- Status: Parish church
- Founded: 1908
- Dedication: Mary
- Events: 1940: original church bombed

Architecture
- Functional status: Active
- Heritage designation: Grade II
- Designated: 25 September 1998
- Architect(s): William Hay Murray (original church); Edward Maufe (present church)
- Style: Perpendicular Gothic Revival
- Groundbreaking: 1952
- Completed: 1954

Administration
- Province: Canterbury
- Diocese: Chichester
- Archdeaconry: Lewes and Hastings
- Deanery: Eastbourne
- Benefice: Hampden Park
- Parish: Hampden Park: St Mary

St Mary's Church (dedicated to St Mary the Virgin) is the Anglican parish church of the Hampden Park suburb of Eastbourne, a town and borough in the English county of East Sussex. Originally linked to the church at nearby Willingdon, it later became a separate parish church. The first building was destroyed by a bomb during World War II, and Edward Maufe was commissioned to design a replacement church; the hilltop building, finished in 1954, has been called "one of his most charming designs". English Heritage has listed it at Grade II for its architectural and historical importance.

== History ==
Until the early 19th century, the area covered by the present town of Eastbourne was thinly populated: there were four small settlements separated by farmland. The oldest, originally known as Bourne and now known as the Old Town, was the site of the old parish church. Residential development was focused on the seafront until the start of the 20th century, when suburbs began to develop inland around the main roads and railway line. These were initially served by the ancient parish church of Willingdon, a village which was later surrounded by 20th-century housing.

Housing developed near Hampden Park railway station (initially named Willingdon) after it opened in 1888. In June 1906, the vicar of Willingdon considered opening a chapel of ease to serve the area. He received support from Freeman Freeman-Thomas, 1st Marquess of Willingdon and his wife Marie: he gave land for the church and she arranged a fundraising concert which added £200 (£21,000 in 2025) to the building fund. The Marchioness laid the first stone of the chapel of ease on 2 May 1908, and it opened in November of that year. Architect William Hay Murray designed a Vernacular-style red-brick, stone and tile building with windows extending above the line of the eaves. Born in London, Murray had established an architectural practice in Hastings by 1874 and had apparently moved to Eastbourne by 1894. He designed or altered several Anglican churches in both towns.

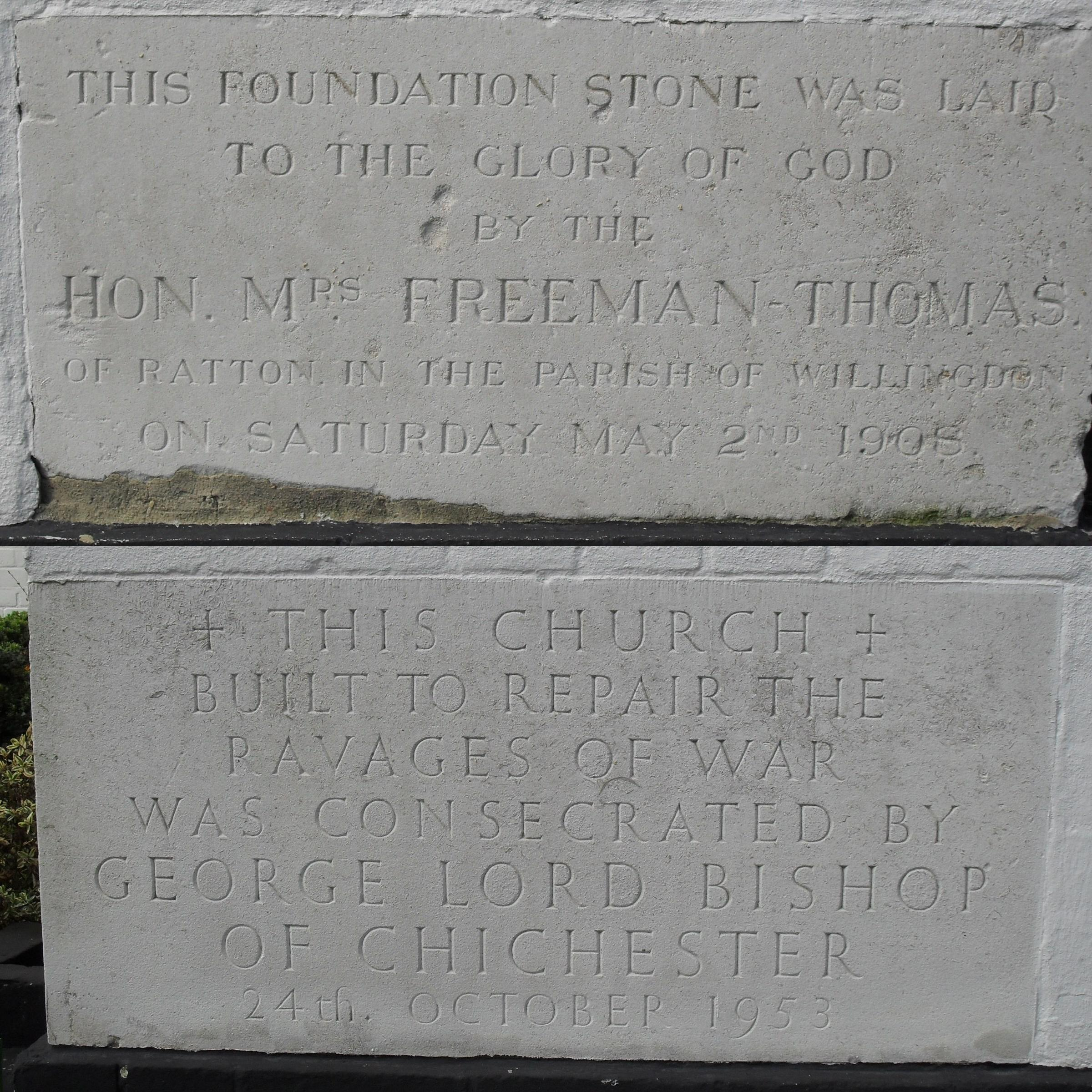
The foundation stone of the original church survives, and is set in the wall near the new foundation stone laid in 1953.

Attempts to make St. Mary's Church independent of its mother church at Willingdon, thereby giving it parish church status in its own right, failed in 1939 because such changes had been suspended since the start of World War II. On 10 October 1940, a bombing raid by a Junkers Ju 88 destroyed the church: only the bell tower survived. A temporary building was put to use as a church by 1945, but a separate parish could still not be established because a permanent church building no longer existed. In December 1948, the Diocese of Chichester commissioned architect Edward Maufe to design a new church on the site. Known nationally for his work on Guildford Cathedral, he had already designed one new church in Sussex—the Bishop Hannington Memorial Church in Hove (1938). Later, he also designed the new St Nicholas' Church at Saltdean.

Work started in 1952, and the new church was ready in 1954. At the same time, work on a long-planned church in The Hydneye, a suburban area east of the railway line, was taking place. Originally to have been dedicated to St Nicholas, it was later called St Peter's Church. It was within the new parish of St Mary's Church. Stained glass was installed in the east window of St Mary's in 1953: Moira Forsyth, daughter of ceramicist Gordon Forsyth, designed it. She had worked with Edward Maufe at Guildford Cathedral and elsewhere.

Rev. Donald Carpenter, the first incumbent at the new church, served for 21 years and is commemorated by a clock on the south face of the tower. Restoration and improvement work was carried out on the interior and exterior between 2000 and 2006.

== Architecture ==
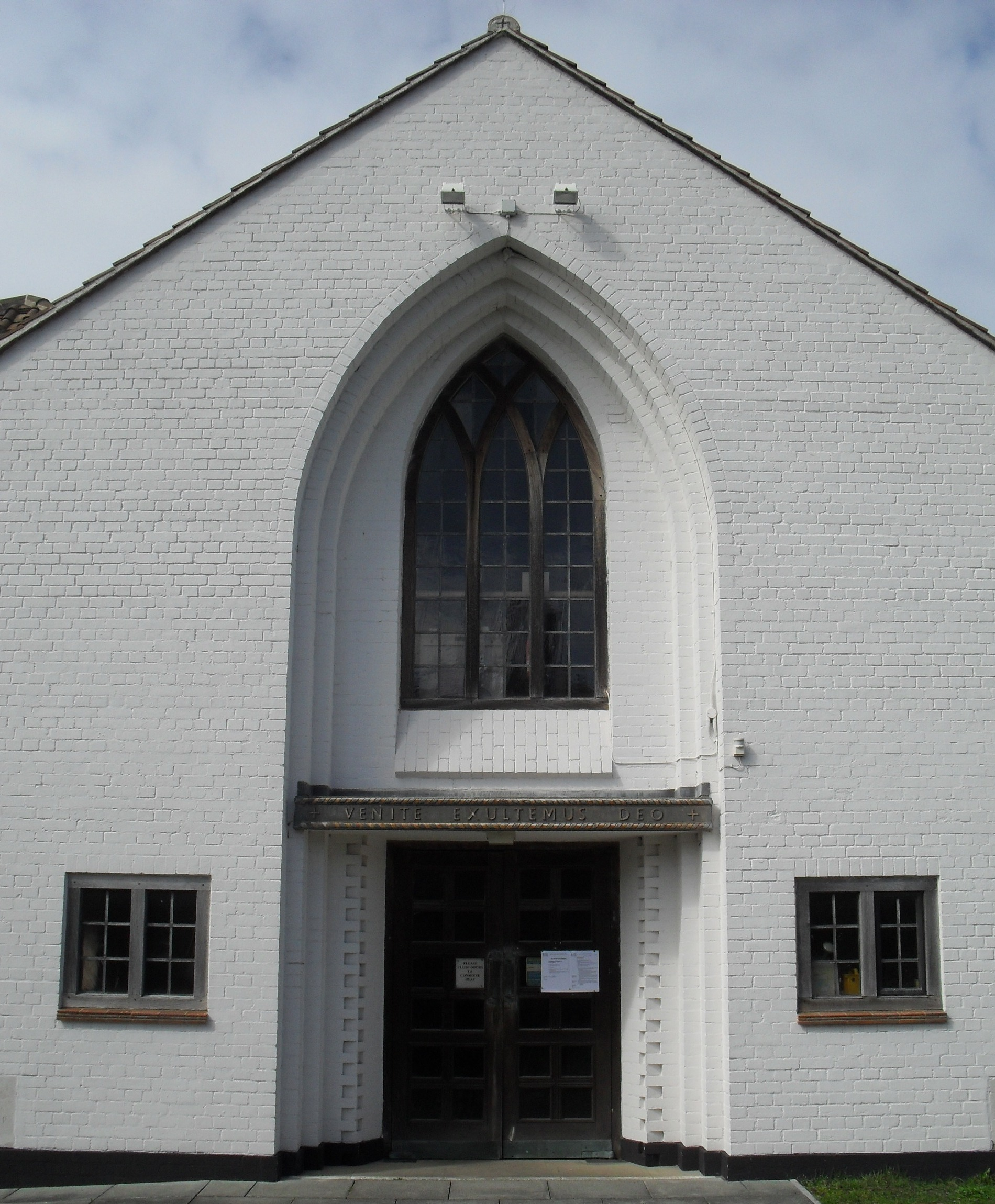
The entrance is set in a deeply recessed pointed arch.

St. Mary's Church became one of the first postwar churches to gain listed status, and it has been praised for the "sculptural quality of its interior" and its "attractive" Perpendicular Gothic Revival form "refined by Maufe in a very personal way". Describing the style as "quintessential Maufe" featuring "the most distinctive elements of his personal style", architectural historian Elain Harwood called it "one of his most charming designs". The style is a simplified, unadorned interpretation of Perpendicular Gothic Revival with elements of the domestic Vernacular style—in particular in the treatment of the wood-framed nave windows. The plan comprises a nave with north and south aisles supported by buttresses, a chancel and sanctuary with an apsidal end, a bellcote at the northwest corner, a Lady chapel and an axially placed tower—an unusual style for Maufe—at the east end. The brick walls are painted white. The wide tower and the church's position on a low hill next to the park make it stand out from the surrounding houses. The roof has a shallow pitch and is laid with red pantiles. The tower, which has the memorial clock on one side, has two pointed-arched openings on each face. The straight-headed entrance is at the west end, set beneath an arch with decorative moulding. A large simplified lancet window is set into the pointed-arched recess above this.

The interior is coated with greyish-white render, and the ceiling is painted pale blue. There is a gallery at the west end. A series of pointed concrete transverse arches form the arcades between the aisles and nave. They have square bases and lack mouldings or capitals, recalling Maufe's earlier (1934) St Thomas the Apostle's Church at Hanwell, London. Other internal features drew inspiration from Scandinavian architecture, including the Högalidskyrkan in Stockholm (by Ivar Tengbom) and the Stockholm City Hall by Ragnar Östberg. Each bay of the aisle has a square timber-framed leaded light window. Stone sedilia are placed in an arched recess near the central altar in the sanctuary, whose ceiling is decorated with stars.

Fittings include a set of limed oak altar rails, a stone font with a wooden cover, and a stone and rendered pulpit attached to the side of the chancel arch.

== The church today ==
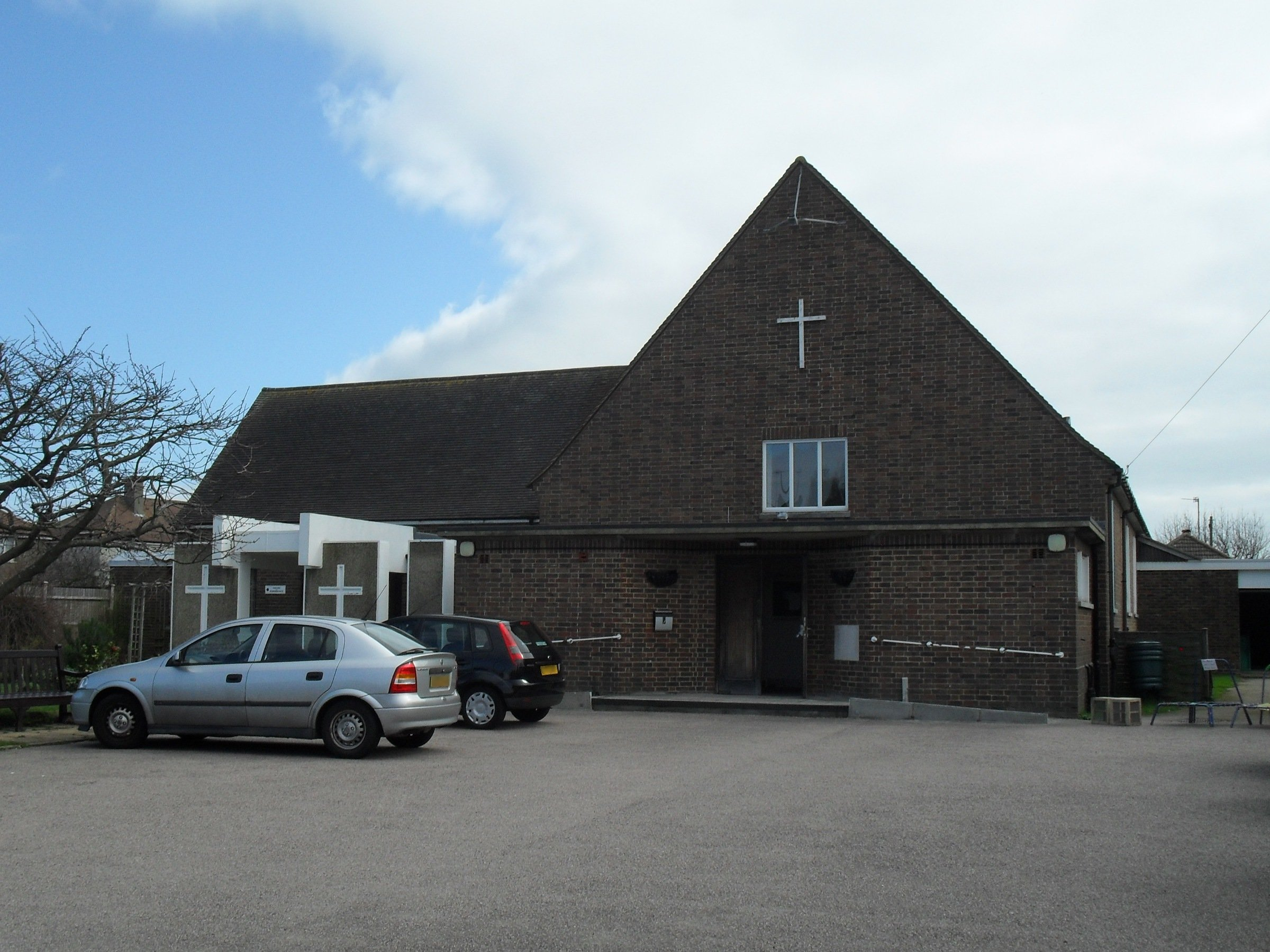
St Peter's Church serves the Hydneye area of Hampden Park.

St Mary's Church was listed as Grade II by English Heritage on 25 September 1998. This defines it as a "nationally important" building of "special interest". In February 2001, it was one of 100 Grade II listed buildings, and 109 listed buildings of all grades in the borough of Eastbourne. Few postwar buildings have this status: English Heritage states that "post-1945 buildings have to be exceptionally important to be listed", as the criteria become stricter the newer a building is.

The parish covers the suburb of Hampden Park in the north of Eastbourne. Its eastern boundary is formed by the railway line between Cross Levels Way and the edge of the urban area. Maywood Avenue, Lindfield Road and Maplehurst Road are the northern limits. The boundary then follows Willingdon Park Road and extends to the southwest as far as the Willingdon Road, then runs north of Eridge Road and Eastbourne District General Hospital. Now separately parished, but part of a joint benefice with St Mary's Church, is St Peter's Church in the Hydneye housing estate. Started in 1953 and completed in the 1970s, the brick church took the dedication of the former St Peter's Church in the Meads area of Eastbourne, which was demolished in 1971. Some stained glass by Charles Eamer Kempe was taken from that church and installed in the new building.

Worship is in the modern Catholic style of the Anglican Church. Each Sunday there is a morning Holy Communion service using the Book of Common Prayer and (except on the fifth Sunday) another service later in the morning. Another Holy Communion service is held on Thursday mornings.

== See also ==
- List of places of worship in Eastbourne
- Listed buildings in Eastbourne
- Media related to St Mary the Virgin's Church, Hampden Park, Eastbourne at Wikimedia Commons
