= St Elisabeth's Church, Eastbourne =

Church building in Eastbourne, East Sussex, England

St Elisabeth's Church
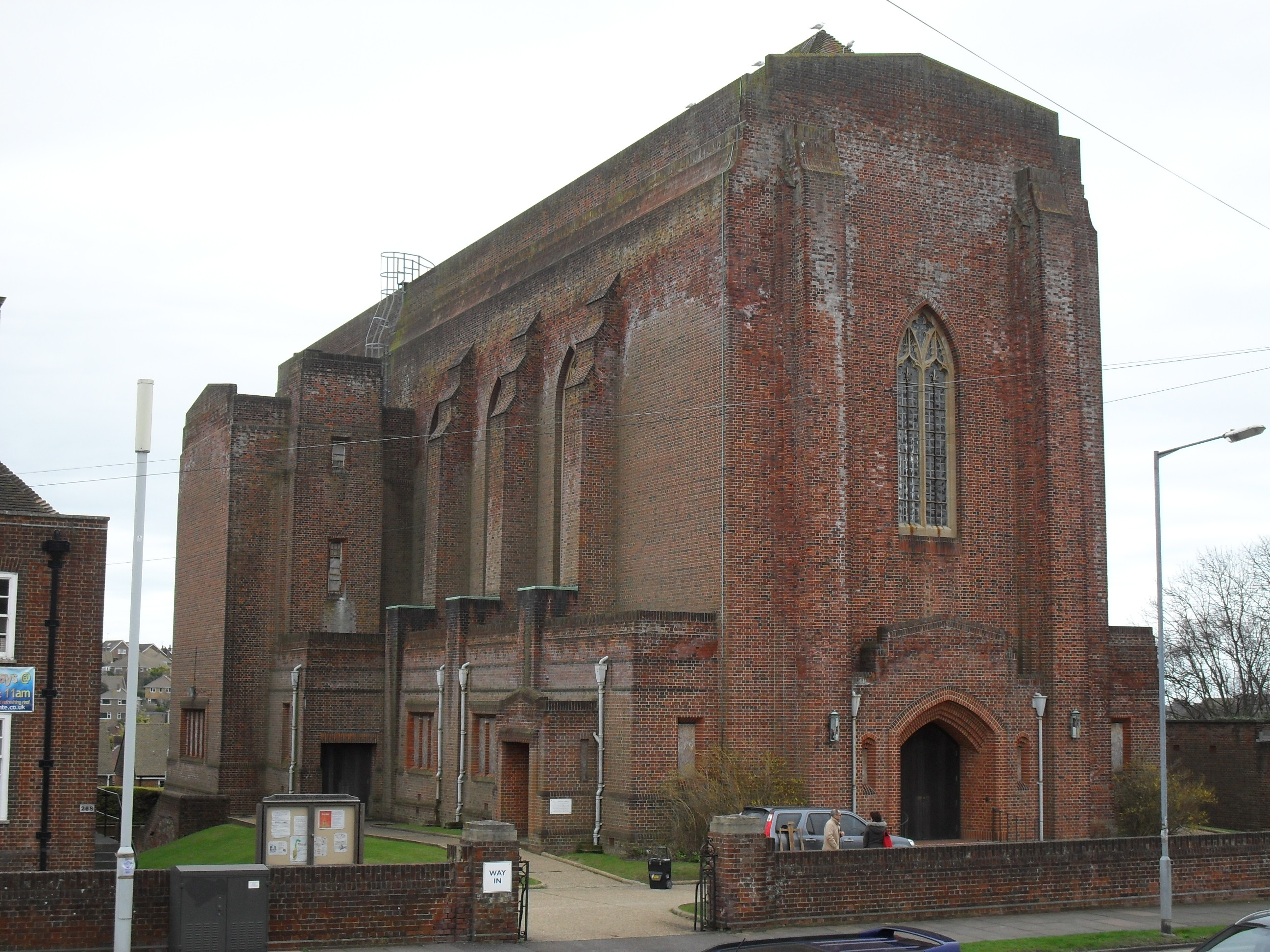
- The original St Elisabeth's Church, seen in 2010.

Religion
- Affiliation: Church of England

Location
- Location: Eastbourne, East Sussex, England
- Interactive map of St Elisabeth's Church
- Coordinates: 50.7831°N 0.2550°E

Architecture
- Architects: Stonham & Sons and Fenning
- Type: Church
- Completed: 1938

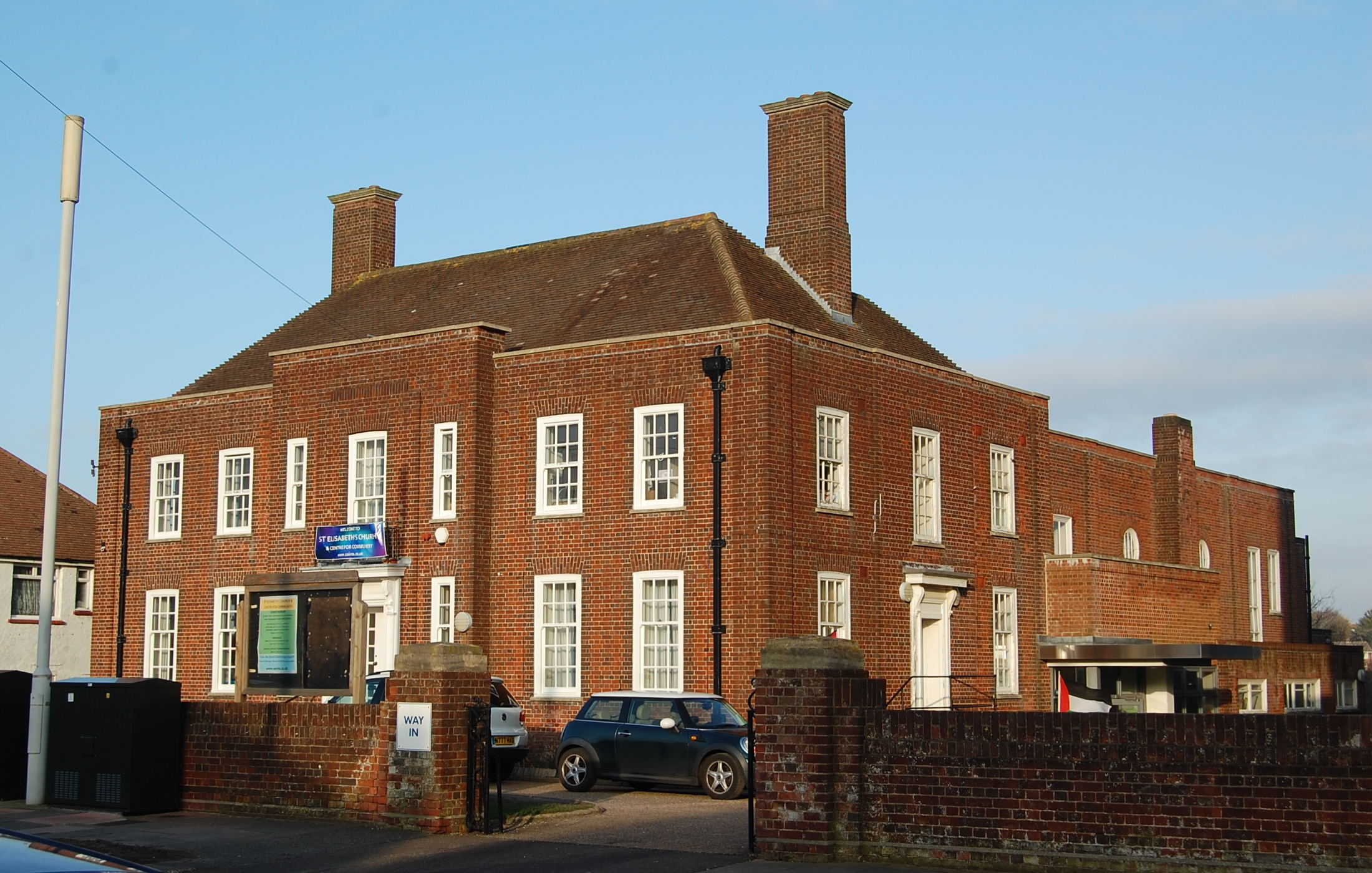
The present St Elisabeth's, formerly the church hall.

St Elisabeth's Church is a Church of England church in the Old Town area of Eastbourne, East Sussex, England. The original church was built between 1935 and 1938 to the designs of local architects Stonham & Sons and Fenning. It became a Grade II listed building in 1994, but was demolished in 2020 due to structural problems. The former church hall has been the present St Elisabeth's Church since 2002. It is also a listed building, as is the vicarage, with both being designated in 1999.

== History ==
=== Construction of St Elisabeth's ===
St Elisabeth's was built to serve the growing area of Old Town in Eastbourne. The church, including its hall and vicarage, were paid for using £90,000 bequeathed by the late Eliza Watson, who died in 1928. She intended for the church, which was to be "erect[ed] in or near to Eastbourne", as a memorial to her brothers, Thomas and William Clarke, and her daughter, Florence Amy Watson. Her money also provided an endowment for the future upkeep of the three buildings and the stipend of the incumbent. The site was gifted by the Duke of Devonshire and the building scheme was carried out in three phases: the church hall, vicarage and church. The hall, built by Messrs Bodle Ltd, was dedicated and opened by the Bishop of Chichester, the Right Rev. George Bell, on 15 December 1932. The vicarage was completed in 1935.

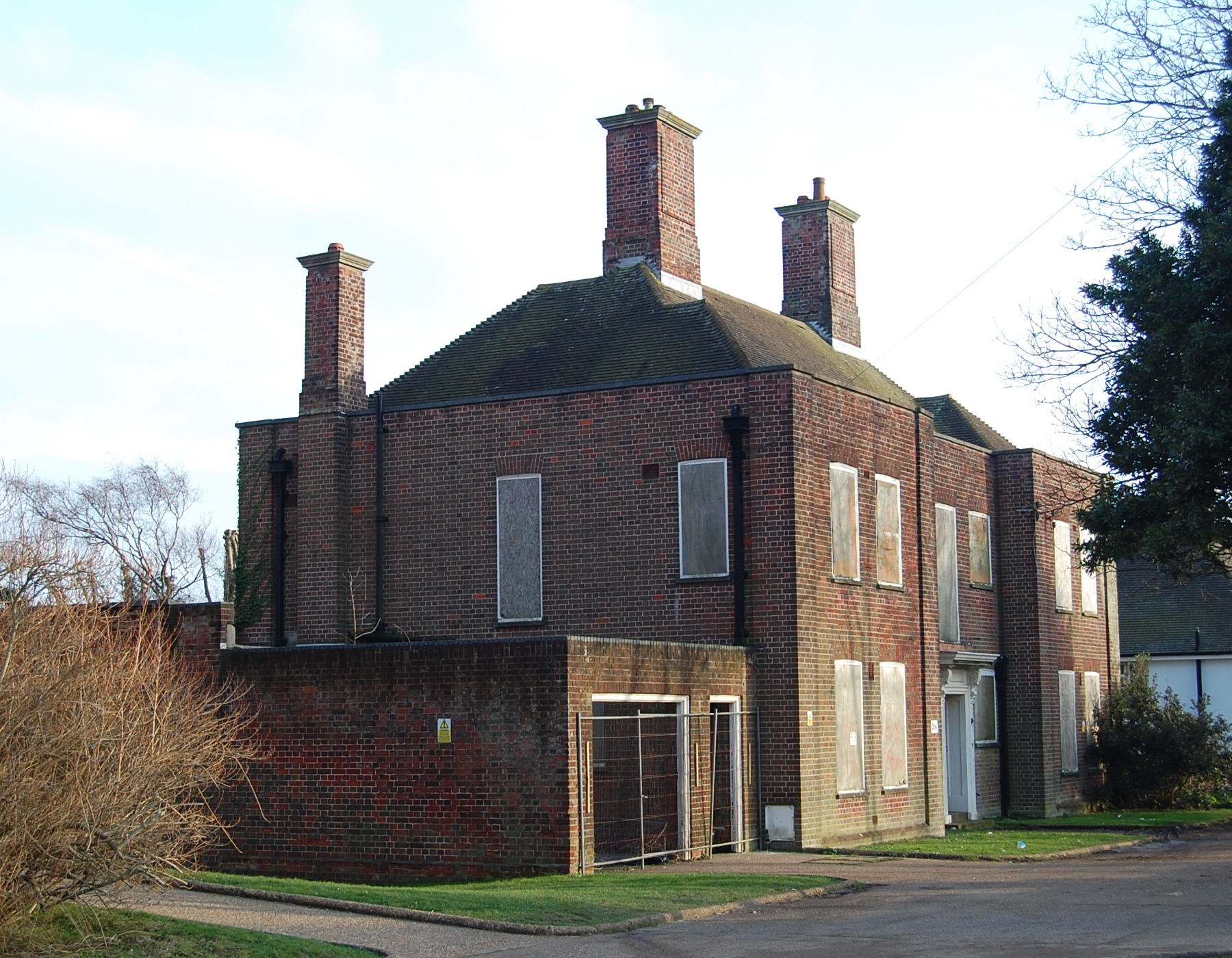
The former vicarage of St Elisabeth's.

The designs for the buildings were drawn up by Messrs Peter D. Stonham and Son and Mr A. R. G. Fenning of Eastbourne, with Messrs Tatchell & Wilson of London as the consulting architects. The builders of the church were Mark Martin & Sons of Eastbourne. The foundation stone was laid by Princess Alice, Countess of Athlone on 2 October 1935 and the completed building was consecrated by the Bishop of Chichester on 19 February 1938. At the time, it was regarded as "the finest example of modern ecclesiastical architecture in Sussex".

=== Structural flaws and post-war repairs ===
Flaws in the design and construction of the church were identified as early as 1939, with the resulting water penetration causing serious damp issues and a deterioration in the building's fabric over the years. On 7 August 1944, the church was further damaged from the effects of blast during an air raid, which caused the stripping of thousands of roof tiles, damage to the steel girders inside the roof, and the cracking and splitting of stonework. The congregation were forced to relocate to the church hall until repairs could be carried out.

In a post-war report, it was concluded that the church would have to face demolition within the next 50 years owing to its structural issues. The vicar of the time, Rev. S. Hugh Hamilton, remarked in 1948 that the congregation had been worshipping "in damp and draught and cold and everlasting echoes for so many years". It was estimated that a demolition and rebuilding scheme would cost £25,000, but ultimately it was agreed with the War Damage Commission, who were funding the repair work, to "reinstate the church in the condition it was immediately preceding the bombing incident".

St Elisabeth's was the first Anglican church in Eastbourne to undergo its post-war repair scheme. The specifications for the repairs were drawn up by W. A. Forsyth and were carried out by Whitfield Banks. The £15,000 work was undertaken between 1949 and 1950, which included reroofing with the placement of approximately 200,000 new tiles, repairing the parapet and reinstating windows. The organ was also removed for repair. Upon completion, the Bishop of Chichester conducted a re-hallowing service on 23 June 1950.

Despite the repair work, St Elisabeth's continued to suffer from its structural defects. In a 1993 survey, it was recorded that the "peculiar fashion" in which the church was constructed has "led to several large-scale structural problems associated with the strong salt-laden winds blowing in from the sea", with its design being "quite unsuitable for its exposed position". The steel ties within the walls had "rusted seriously, causing expansion and cracking" and the internal plaster had become "hygroscopic as a result of the rising damp which has penetrated from outside".

=== 1990s closure and redevelopment proposals for original church building ===
In 1993, church leaders approved plans to move St Elisabeth's congregation to the nearby Roman Catholic church of St Gregory's under an unusual scheme for Roman Catholic and Anglican members to worship under the same roof. The scheme was first suggested in the early 1980s and serious discussions between the two churches began in 1991. It was intended to demolish St Elisabeth's and use the money raised from the sale of the site to extend the hall of St Gregory's, build a new vicarage and undertake a potential reordering of the church. Planning permission was obtained for the demolition in November 1993, but these plans were thwarted the following year when it became a Grade II listed building, with Hans Feibusch's mural in the crypt noted as being of particular historical interest. The plans to merge the Anglican and Roman Catholic congregations was abandoned in April 1995, by which time St Elisabeth's faced repair costs of £1 million.

In 1995, proposals were made by the Chichester Housing Association to demolish part of the church, retaining around a third of the building, and redevelop the rest of the site for housing. The plans aimed to safeguard Feibusch's mural in the crypt as the cost of moving it was deemed prohibitive. The scheme received planning permission, but did not come to fruition and a similar proposal made by the housing association Raglan in 1996 also failed to materialise.

=== Closure and demolition of original church ===
The church continued to be used as a place for worship until it closed on 1 July 2002. It was considered unnecessarily large for the size of the present congregation and was facing large repair costs, which amounted to over £3 million at the time of closure. The congregation permanently relocated to the church hall and the church building was put up for sale in 2003. A scheme to convert it into 25 apartments, along with the conversion of the vicarage into three dwellings and the construction of a pair of semi-detached properties behind it, was made by H.O.P. Construction & Developments Ltd in 2010. Planning permission and listed building consent were refused in 2011, on the grounds that the "alterations to the church and proposed roof extensions would result in a form of development that would be detrimental to the character and appearance of the listed building", and a subsequent appeal was dismissed. In 2017, the Church Commissioners announced their plans to demolish the church and this was carried out in 2020.

== Tristram paintings ==
The church's 1938 chancel paintings by the art historian and conservator Ernest William Tristram (1882-1952) are now housed in the new domed church building next door. They depict the life of John the Baptist and his parents, the priest Zacharias and his wife Elizabeth.

== Feibusch's mural ==
St Elisabeth's crypt contained a series of large wall paintings by the artist Hans Feibusch (1898-1998). Through this work, he came to the attention of Charles Herbert Reilly, professor of architecture, and the Bishop of Chichester, the Right Rev. George Bell, and they provided Feinbusch with the opportunity to create a mural of his own design at St Elisabeth's. The offer was accepted by St Elisabeth's Church Council in October 1943 and was carried out in 1944.

Feibusch chose the allegory of Pilgrim's Progress as a vehicle for his own story as a refugee fleeing Nazi Germany and his eventual acceptance in 1940s Britain. He was assisted by four members of Eastbourne School of Art – Barbara Richards, Miriam Furth, Kenneth Adams and Vivian Smith – and Doreen Randall of St Elisabeth's, with architect Frankland Dark as a consultant for the work. Upon its completion, the crypt and its mural was dedicated by the Bishop of Chichester on 22 October 1944 as a chapel of remembrance to "our brothers from this parish and congregation who have given their lives in the service of their country". In 2019, with the church's impending demolition, work began on the removal of the mural for its future preservation.

== Gallery ==
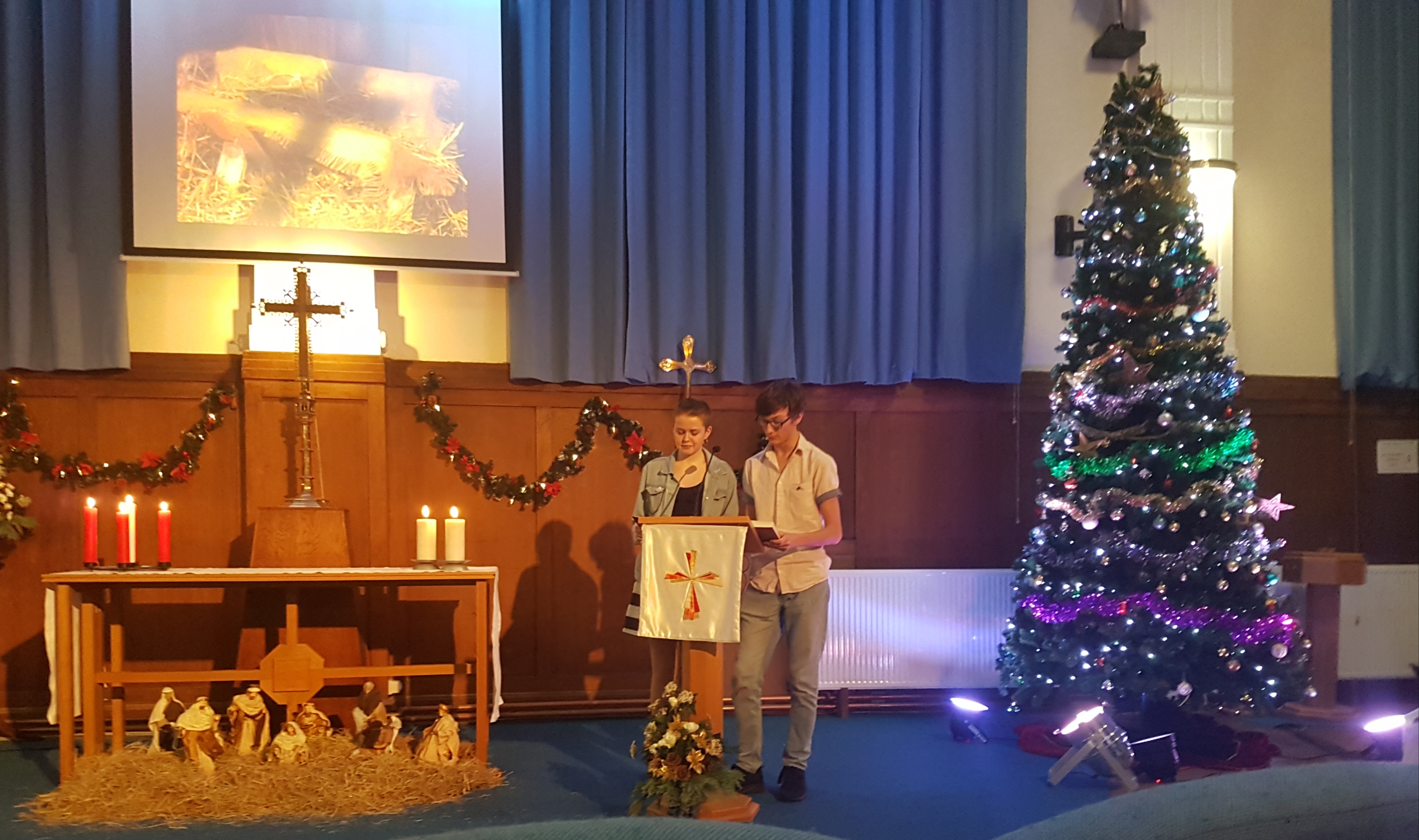
Christmas

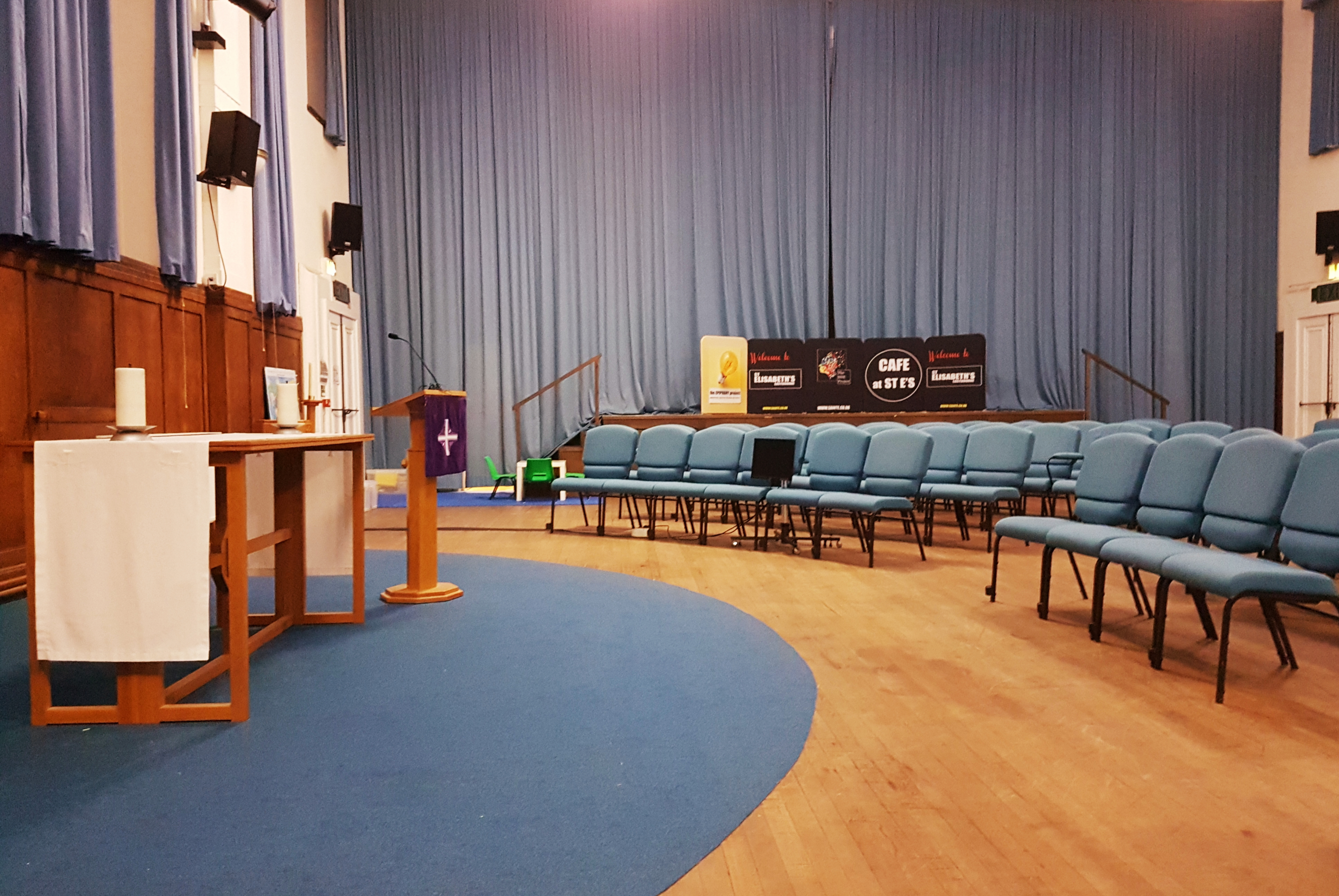
Worship space

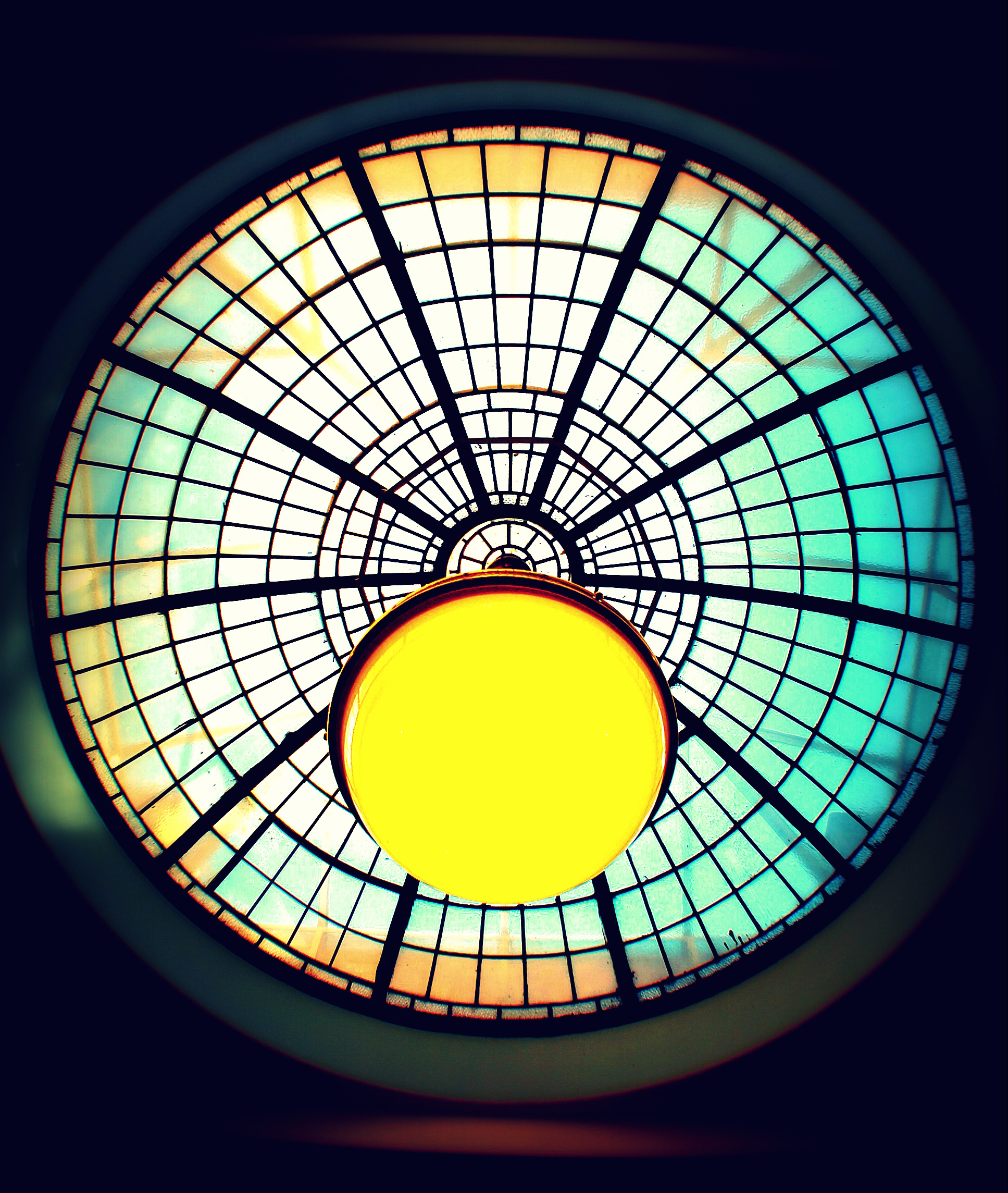
The dome

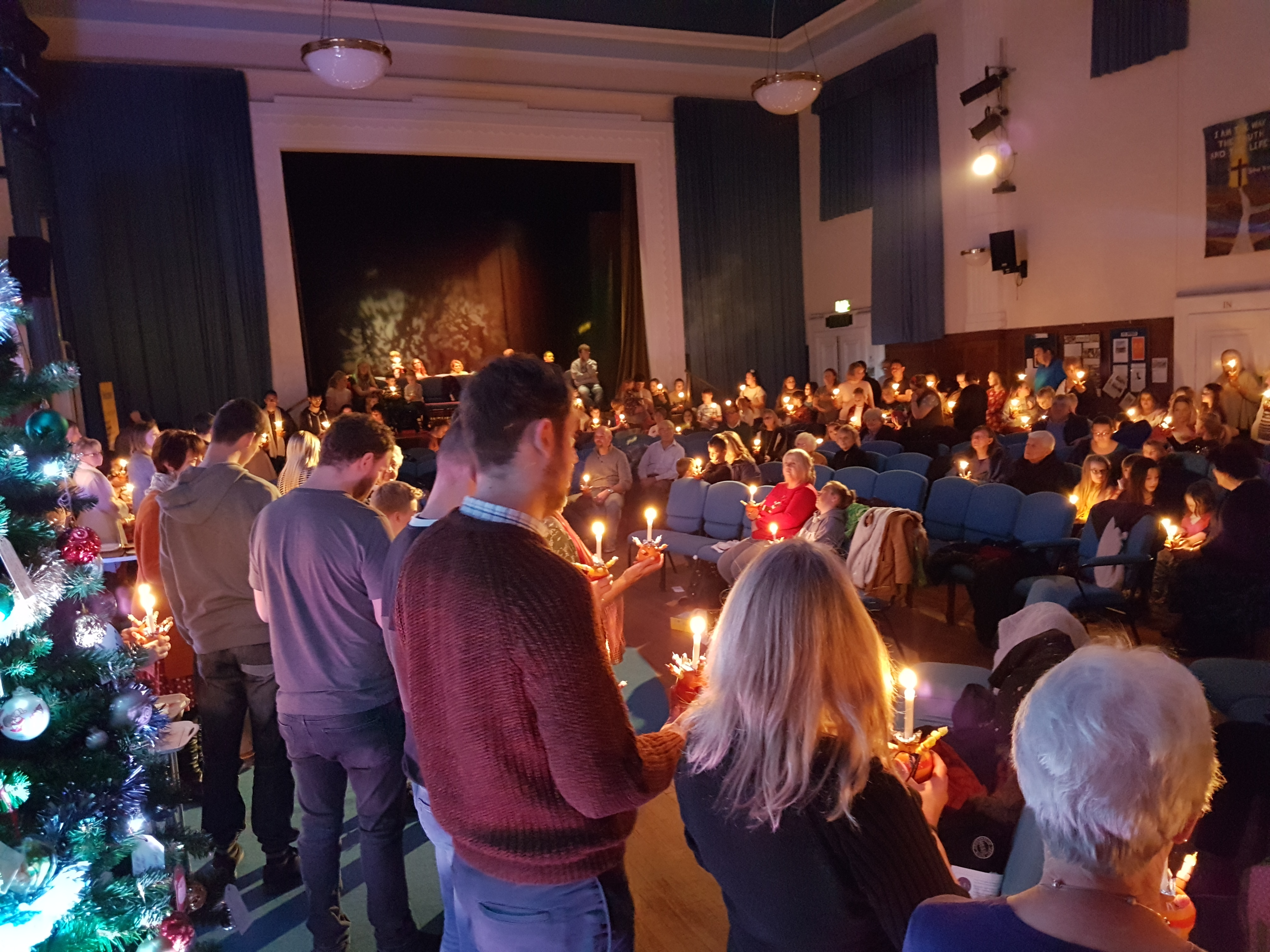
Christingle

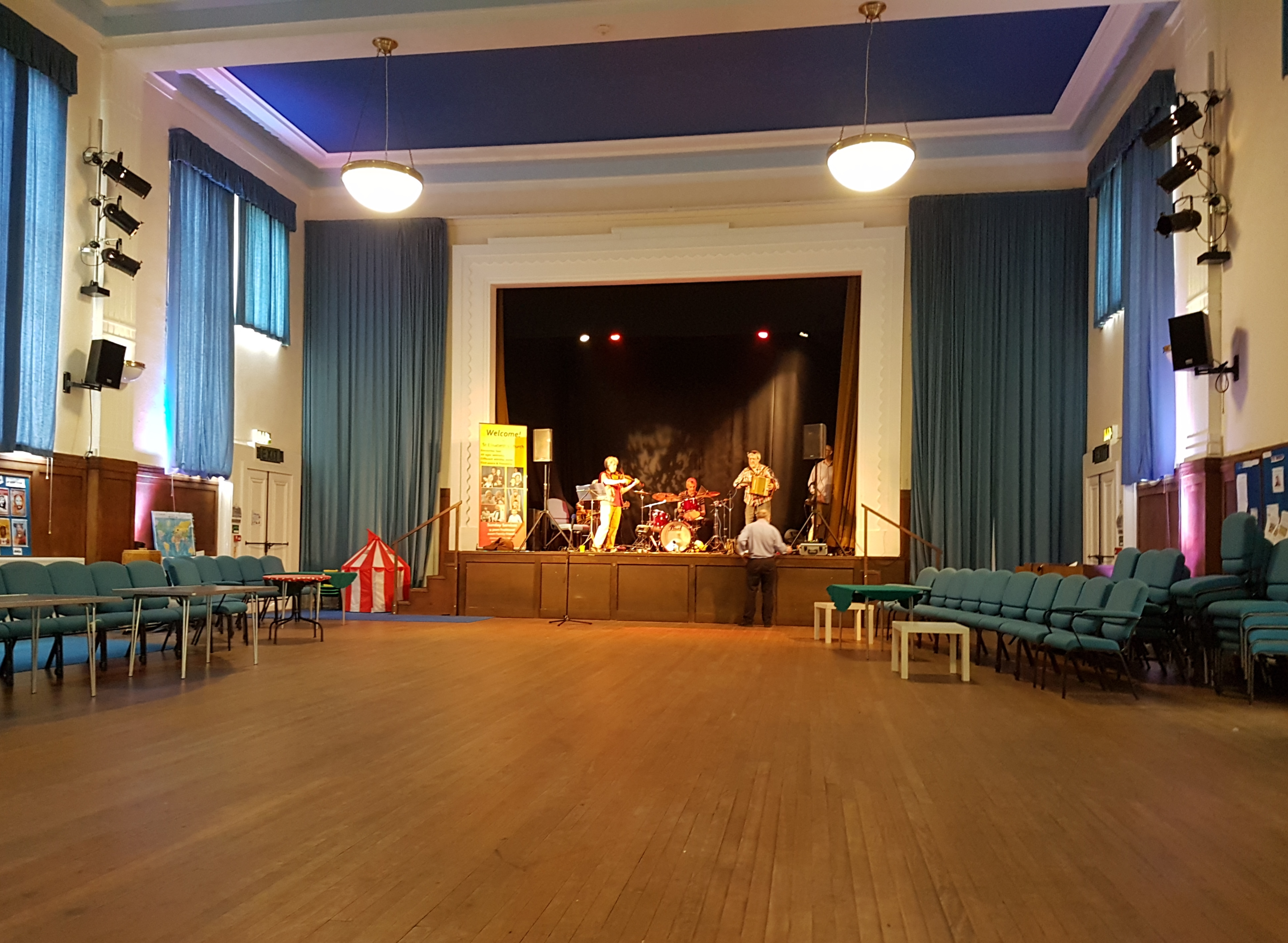
Main hall

== See also ==
- List of places of worship in Eastbourne
- Listed buildings in Eastbourne
