= St Saviour's Church, Eastbourne =

- Church of St Saviour and St Peter
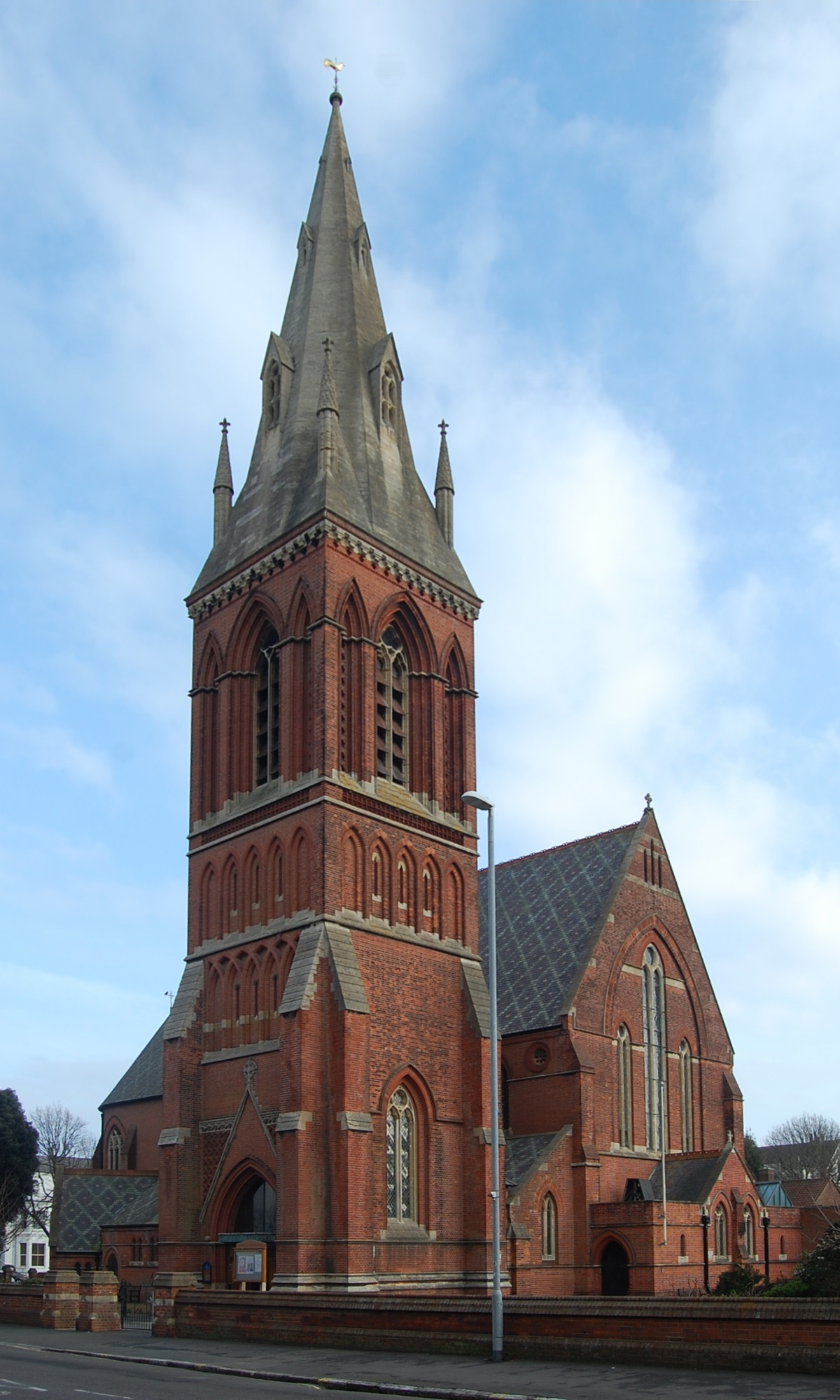
- St Saviour's Church, Eastbourne
- 50.7659°N 0.283°E
- Country: England
- Denomination: Church of England
- Churchmanship: Traditional Catholic

History
- Former name: Church of the Holy Saviour
- Status: Active
- Consecrated: 31 January 1867

Architecture
- Functional status: Parish church
- Heritage designation: Grade II* listed
- Designated: 17 May 1971
- Architect: G. E. Street

Administration
- Diocese: Diocese of Chichester
- Archdeaconry: Archdeaconry of Hastings
- Deanery: Eastbourne
- Parish: St. Saviour and St. Peter, Eastbourne

Clergy
- Bishop: The Rt Revd Martin Warner (AEO)
- Vicar: Fr Mark McAulay SSC

St Saviour's Church is a Church of England parish church in Eastbourne, East Sussex. The church is a grade II* listed building which was designed by G. E. Street.

== History ==
St Saviour's Church was designed by George Edmund Street. On 17 October 1865, the foundation stone of the new church was laid. The main church building was built from 1865 to 1866, and its steeple was built from 1870 to 1872. The church was consecrated on 31 January 1867 by Ashurst Gilbert, the Bishop of Chichester. It is made from red brick with Bath stone dressings, and has a polychrome, clay tile roof. There were later additions to the church: a baptistry was added in 1892; a chapel was added to the south in 1903; and church room was built in 1954.

The church was originally dedicated as the Church of the Holy Saviour. In 1971, the neighbouring St Peter's Church was demolished and the two parishes were combined, but it remained St Saviour's Church.

On 17 May 1971, the church was designated a grade II* listed building.

=== Present day ===
St Saviour's Church is in the parish of St. Saviour and St. Peter, Eastbourne in the Archdeaconry of Hastings of the Diocese of Chichester.

The church was built as a Tractarian place of worship, and the parish currently stands in the Traditional Anglo-Catholic tradition of the Church of England. As the parish is against the ordination of women, it receives alternative episcopal oversight from the Bishop of Chichester (currently Martin Warner), and is a member of both Forward in Faith and The Society.

== List of vicars ==
There have been ten Vicars of St Saviour's Church:

- 1867–1897: Henry Robert Whelpton
- 1897–1927: Henry Urling Whelpton
- 1928–1944: Claude Williams
- 1944–1961: Joseph Guy Heatherington
- 1962–1976: Owen Whiting
- 1976–1991: Derek William Allen
- 1992–2004: Derek Mottershead
- 2005–2015: Jeffery Thomas Gunn
- 2016–2017: Christopher Yates
- 2018-date: Mark McAulay SSC
