= Hampden Park, Eastbourne =

Suburb of Eastbourne, East Sussex, England

Coordinates: 50.796861°N 0.278083°E

Hampden Park
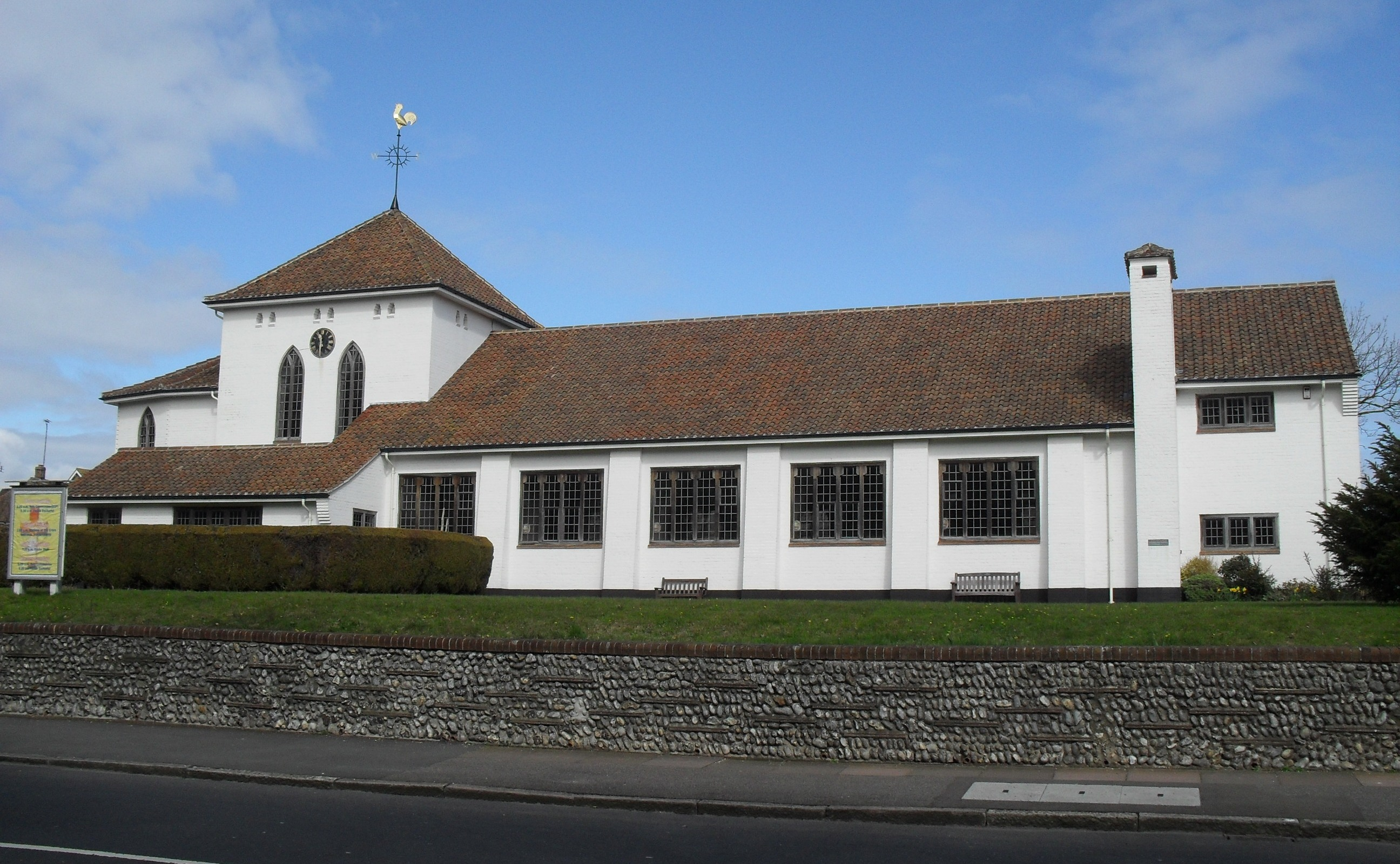
- St Mary's Church

- Location within East Sussex
- Population: 13,200 (2026.Neighbourhood)
- OS grid reference: TQ605022
- District: Eastbourne
- Shire county: East Sussex
- Region: South East
- Country: England
- Sovereign state: United Kingdom
- Post town: EASTBOURNE
- Postcode district: BN22
- Dialling code: 01323
- Police: Sussex
- Fire: East Sussex
- Ambulance: South East Coast
- UK Parliament: Eastbourne

Hampden Park is a suburb and neighbourhood of Eastbourne named after the nearby park, based within the county of East Sussex, England. It is notable for its unique railway station, where trains on the East Coastway Line often travel through twice, and is often thought to be one of the busiest level crossings in Europe.

== Attractions ==
=== Hampden Park ===
Hampden Park itself is a large park and woodland area that is considered the first public park in Eastbourne. In the southern part of the park, there are rugby and football pitches, alongside a skate park, tennis court, children's play area, and a café. The northern part is made up of a large pond (Decoy Pond), and woodland. Its main inhabitants are the grey squirrel, and several species inhabit the lake, notably mallard ducks, Canada geese, mute swans, moorhen, herons, gulls and the rock pigeon.

In 2011 there was a large pond enhancement program carried out on the Decoy Pond. This was funded by Eastbourne Borough Council and a large grant obtained from the Big Lottery Fund by The Friends of the Hampden Park.

== Sport and Leisure ==
=== Recreation ===
Outside of Hampden Park, there exists other recreation grounds and play areas across Hampden Park, such as Tugwell Park.

=== Sports Clubs and Centers ===
Hampden Park is home to Eastbourne Rugby Club, and both an indoor and outdoor bowls club operate and run outside of Hampden Park. A sports center also is available to the general public, containing facilities such as basketball courts, and an outdoor 3G football pitch.

== Economy ==
Hampden Park has a primary shopping area based out of Brassey Parade near the Hampden Park railway station, and the Brampton Road Industrial Estate, both of which provide employment and economical factors towards the neighbourhood.

== Transport ==
=== Rail ===
The railway station in Hampden Park, initially called Willingdon, and renamed Hampden Park under British Railways, is served by Southern, and has regular services towards Hastings, Ashford, and both London and Brighton via Lewes.

=== Buses ===
Local bus services serve Hampden Park for the Eastbourne District General Hospital, Polegate, or Eastbourne Town Center. All bus services within Hampden Park are operated by Stagecoach South East, with the routes numbers being 6, 1, 1A, and The Link.

== History ==
Prior to 1901 the land now called Hampden Park was part of the Ratton Estate owned by Lord Willingdon. Ratton is mentioned in the Domesday survey of 1087 and for a long time the woodland and lake had been a decoy attracting wildfowl for the estate kitchens. By the end of the 19th century the lake had probably fallen into disuse. Lord Willingdon agreed to sell 78 acres (320,000 m^{2}) to Eastbourne Corporation on condition that a new main road, Kings Drive, was built from Eastbourne to Willingdon. Hampden Park, named after Lord Willingdon's grandfather, Viscount Hampden, was opened by Lord Rosebery on 12 August 1902 and was the first Corporation-owned park in Eastbourne.

The parish was formed on 1 April 1911 from part of Willingdon. In 1911 the parish had a population of 988. On 1 April 1912 the parish was abolished and merged with Eastbourne.

St Mary's Church is the Anglican parish church of Hampden Park. Edward Maufe's Perpendicular Gothic Revival building of 1952–54 replaced a church of 1908 which had been destroyed by a bomb in 1940. It is a Grade II listed building..
