= Palm Court =

Palm Court may refer to:

- Palm court - a large room, usually in a prestigious hotel, where functions are staged
- Palm Court (Alexandria Hotel) - historic ballroom in Los Angeles, California
- Palm Court at the Ritz Hotel - site of "Tea at the Ritz" in London, England
