= Albert Bilicke =

American real estate broker (1861–1915)

Albert Clay Bilicke
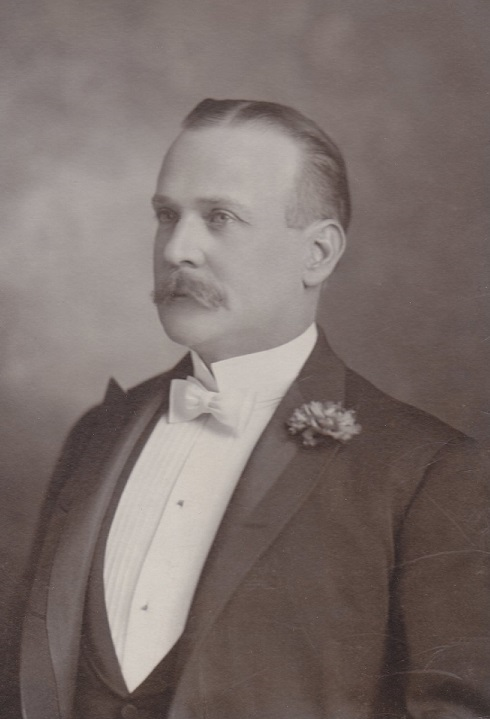
- Born: June 22, 1861; Coos County, Oregon, United States
- Died: May 7, 1915 (aged 53); At sea (RMS Lusitania)
- Spouse: Gladys Huff Bilicke (m. September 10, 1900)
- Children: Albert Constant Bilicke (b. 1902); Nancy Caroline Bilicke (b. 1903); Carl Archibald Bilicke (b. 1907)

Albert Clay Bilicke (June 22, 1861 – May 7, 1915) was a millionaire hotelier and builder in Los Angeles. Bilicke and his father ran the Cosmopolitan Hotel in Tombstone, Arizona. After it was destroyed by a fire in 1882 he moved to California. In Los Angeles he built the Hotel Alexandria (1906) and was president of the Alexandria Hotel Company. He partnered with Robert Rowan in a building company. He was presumed drowned after being lost at sea while a passenger on the Cunard liner RMS Lusitania which was torpedoed and sunk by German submarine SM U-20 off the coast of Ireland. His wife Gladys survived.

His parents were German immigrants and his father was the proprietor of the Cosmopolitan Hotel in Tombstone, Arizona. Bilicke was born in Coos Bay, Oregon.

Bilicke was acquainted with Wyatt Earp and testified at his trial after the shooting at the O.K. Corral.

The Cosmopolitan was destroyed by a fire in 1882. A. C. Bilicke planned to rebuild it.

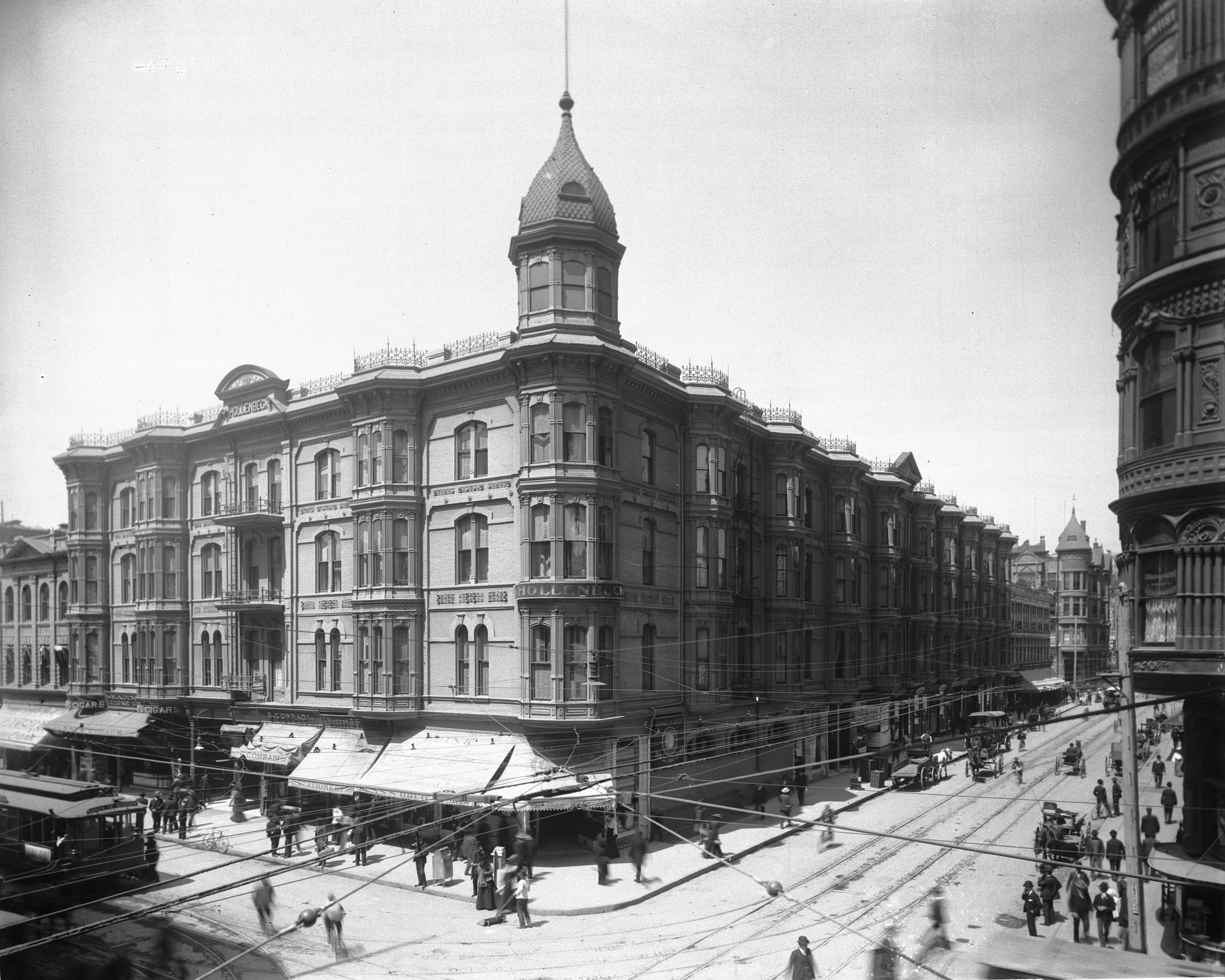
Hollenbeck Hotel

Bilicke bought the Hollenbeck Hotel in Los Angeles in 1893. He joined with Robert Rowan to form the Bilicke-Rowan Fireproof Building Company, a construction firm the built the Alexandria Hotel. The Rowan Building in Los Angeles is named for Rowan.
