= Grand Hotel, Eastbourne =

Hotel in East Sussex, England

Coordinates: 50.760228°N 0.283086°E

The Grand Hotel, Eastbourne, East Sussex

The Grand Hotel is a Victorian hotel, also known as the 'White Palace', located on King Edwards Parade, Eastbourne in East Sussex, England. The 5 star hotel is part of an independent UK based hotel group, Elite Hotels, who also own Tylney Hall in Hampshire and Ashdown Park Hotel near Forest Row.

== Heritage ==
On 13 May 1874 the Eastbourne Gazette announced that a local resident William Earp was proposing to build a hotel with a 400-foot frontage at a cost of £50,000. The result was the Grand Hotel, designed by local architect Robert Knott Blessley and constructed in 1875.

The Grand Hotel is well known for its association with music. Claude Debussy corrected the proofs of La Mer between 24 July and 30 August 1905 in Suite 200, which is now known as the Debussy Suite. Eastbourne was also where Frank Bridge completed work on his suite The Sea in 1911. Edward Elgar was a visitor in 1926.

The Grand Hotel Orchestra broadcast palm court music live on the BBC from the Great Hall every Sunday night from 1925 to 1939 on the programme Grand Hotel. During the Second World War, Eastbourne was easy prey to air raids and the hotel eventually closed down and became a military headquarters.

The hotel was taken over by the De Vere Hotel Group in 1965 and then by Elite Hotels in 1998 when a complete refurbishment took place. The tradition of live music and dancing continues.

== Rooms ==
The Grand Hotel has 152 rooms, including 23 suites, 30 junior suites and 99 rooms. The hotel also offers conference and banqueting facilities with 17 fully equipped conference and meeting rooms of varying size. The largest is the Compton Room which can accommodate up to 300 guests in a theatre-style layout.
