= Hotel Alexandria =

Historic building in Los Angeles, California

- U.S. Historic district – Contributing property
- Los Angeles Historic-Cultural Monument
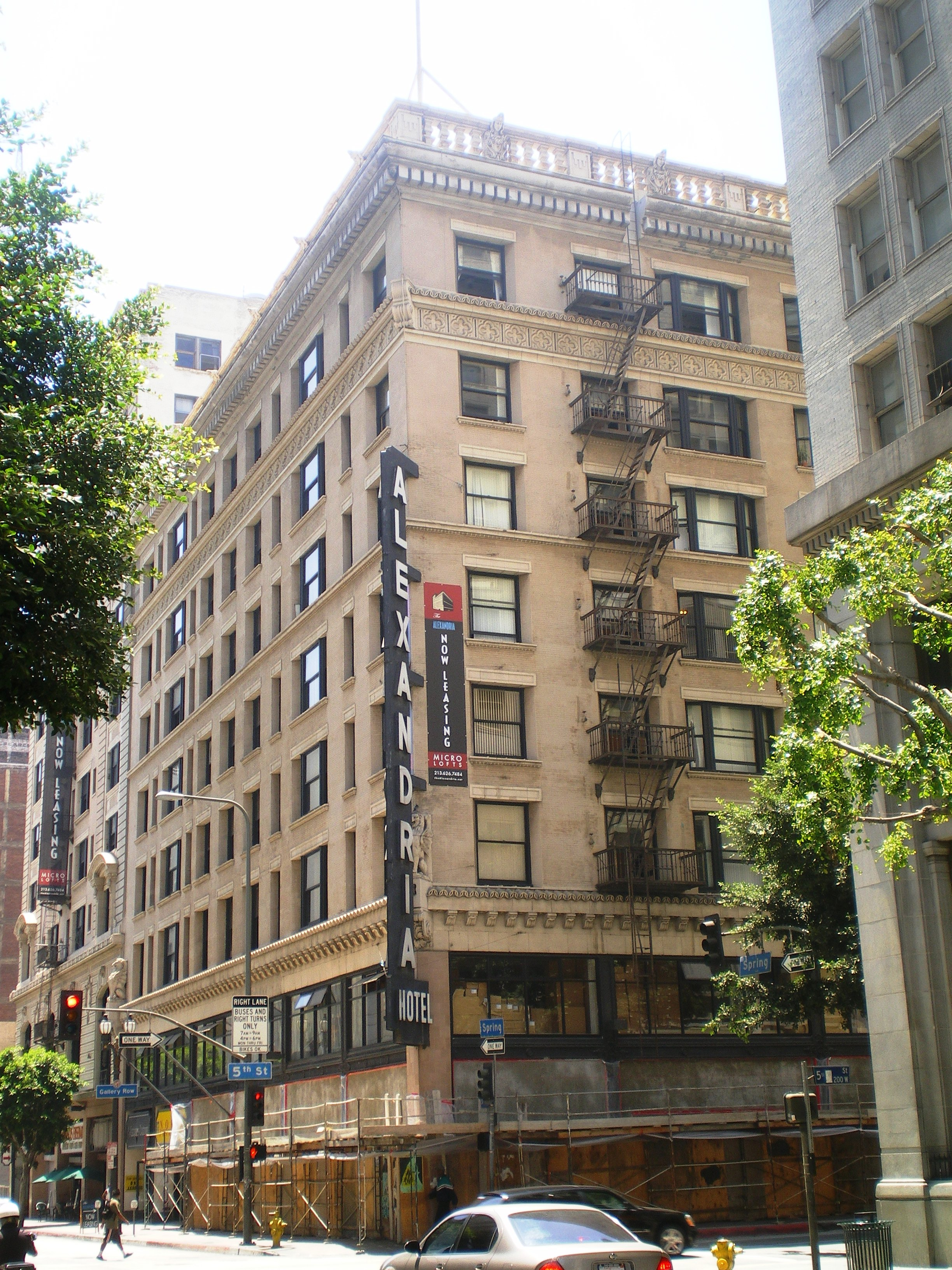
- The building under renovation in 2008

- Location within the Los Angeles metropolitan area
- Location: 501-511 South Spring Street, Los Angeles, California, United States
- Coordinates: 34.047222°N 118.249722°W
- Built: 1906, 1911 addition
- Architect: John B. Parkinson (1906), Parkinson & Bergstrom (1911 addition)
- Part of: Spring Street Financial District (ID79000489)
- LAHCM No.: 80

Significant dates
- Designated CP: August 10, 1979
- Designated LAHCM: October 9, 2013

Hotel Alexandria is a historic building located at 501-511 South Spring Street in Los Angeles, California. Constructed in 1906, it was Los Angeles's first luxury hotel and was immensely popular with numerous historical figures, especially those in the early film industry. It later fell into disrepute, at one point being considered the worst drug trafficking location in Los Angeles. The building was converted to residential use in 2005; it is also a popular event space and film shoot location.

Hotel Alexandria and its Palm Court ballroom are a Los Angeles Historic Cultural Monument; the building is also a contributing property in the National Register of Historic Places-listed Spring Street Financial District.

== History ==
=== Early years ===
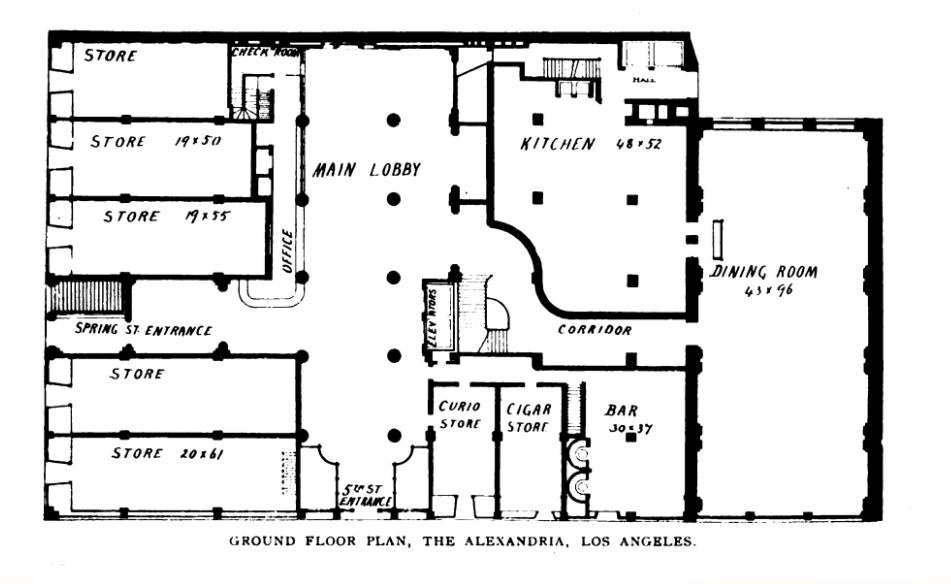
Original floor plan

Hotel Alexandria was designed by John B. Parkinson, constructed by developers Albert Bilicke and Robert Arnold Rowan, and named after its owner: Harry Alexander. It opened as an eight-story luxury hotel on February 12, 1906, making it the first luxury hotel in downtown Los Angeles. The cost of construction was $2 million ($71.7 million in 2025), an unheard of amount at the time.

The hotel was an immediate hit and its popularity resulted in Parkinson & Bergstrom designing a twelve-story addition, which was built behind the original building in 1911. Bilicke and Rowan petitioned the city to raise its restriction on building heights from eight to twelve stories before building the addition.

Bilicke died in 1915 and Rowan died not long after. Their widows, Gladys Huff Bilicke and Laura Schwarz Rowan, sold the hotel in 1919 to the builders of the nearby Ambassador Hotel. Hotel Alexandria was the most luxurious hotel in Los Angeles until the construction of the Millennium Biltmore Hotel in 1923.

Notable guests during the hotel's early years include Winston Churchill, Enrico Caruso, James J. Jeffries, Jack Dempsey, King Edward VIII (disputed), and US Presidents William Howard Taft, Woodrow Wilson, and Theodore Roosevelt. The hotel was particularly popular with actors and filmmakers, including: Mary Pickford, Charlie Chaplin, Norman Kerry, Rudolph Valentino (an unknown actor during his stay), D. W. Griffith, Douglas Fairbanks, William S. Hart, Louis B. Mayer, and Mack Sennett. Reporters often waited in the hotel lobby to see the famous guests, aspiring filmmakers frequently filled the lobby, and elevator operators occasionally pitched and sold movie ideas to producers.

=== Continued use ===
Ambassador Hotel sold Hotel Alexandria in 1927, and the hotel was sold again in 1930, then went bankrupt and closed in 1932. In 1934, the hotel's gold leaf ceilings, furniture, chandeliers and other fittings were sold to pay off debts. The hotel was sold again in 1937, to film producer Phil Goldstone, who renovated and reopened it. Goldstone sold the hotel in 1946. In 1954, the new hotel's owners filled in the mezzanine floor in the hotel lobby so it could house the Pacific Coast Merchandise Mart. The lobby below was given a "Mid-century modern French Provincial look, featuring square pillars, custom-made furniture and planters".

In 1958, boxing promoter George Parnassus leased the hotel's ballrooms and Palm Court, where he constructed boxing rings and charged individuals to watch boxers train. The hotel was acquired by real estate developer S. Jon Kreedman in 1961, and in 1970 he renovated it in a faux-Victorian style. Hotel Alexandria's Palm Court was declared a Los Angeles Historic Cultural Monument on March 3, 1971, and the hotel was completely refurbished the following year. In 1979, the Spring Street Financial District was added to the National Register of Historic Places, with Alexandria Hotel listed as a contributing property in the district.

=== Decay and rebirth ===
Los Angeles's Skid Row was established in 1976, and Hotel Alexandria's location near it resulted in it struggling to attract overnight guests. By the early 1980s, the building's decline, including low occupancy and shabby interiors, had become noticeable. The building was gradually transformed into a single-room occupancy hotel, housing long-term low-income residents. It then became notorious for drugs and crime, and in 1988 the City of Los Angeles declared Hotel Alexandria as the worst drug trafficking location in the city.

By 2005, the area around Hotel Alexandria had transformed with the conversion of numerous buildings to residential lofts, and Hotel Alexandria's new owners converted it into an apartment building. The building's ballrooms are frequently rented for events, film shoots, and weddings. From 2010 to 2014, the building lobby housed The Gorbals, a restaurant run by Top Chef winner Ilan Hall.

In 2013, Hotel Alexandria's Los Angeles Historic Cultural Monument listing was expanded from the Palm Court to the entire building. In 2014, Izak Shomof purchased the building, after which he restored the Palm Court, second floor ballroom, and portions of the lobby. In 2019, a 1900s-themed Parisian bar and restaurant opened in the building.

=== Phantom wing ===
Hotel Alexandria once had an additional wing on its 5th Street side. It was built in 1905 by local businessman William Chick, owner of the land, in conjunction with the hotel. The wing mirrored the hotel's design, and each floor offered rooms on hallways that connected to the Alexandria. The wind did not feature elevators; instead it relied on the hotel's.

In 1938, the wing's new owners came into conflict with the Alexandria, and so the Alexandria bricked up its hallways, making the wing's rooms inaccessible. The wing's ground floor retail spaces, however, remained in use.

The wing was sold in 2012, after which an elevator was added and the building converted to condos. The building no longer has any connection to the Alexandria.

== Architecture and design ==
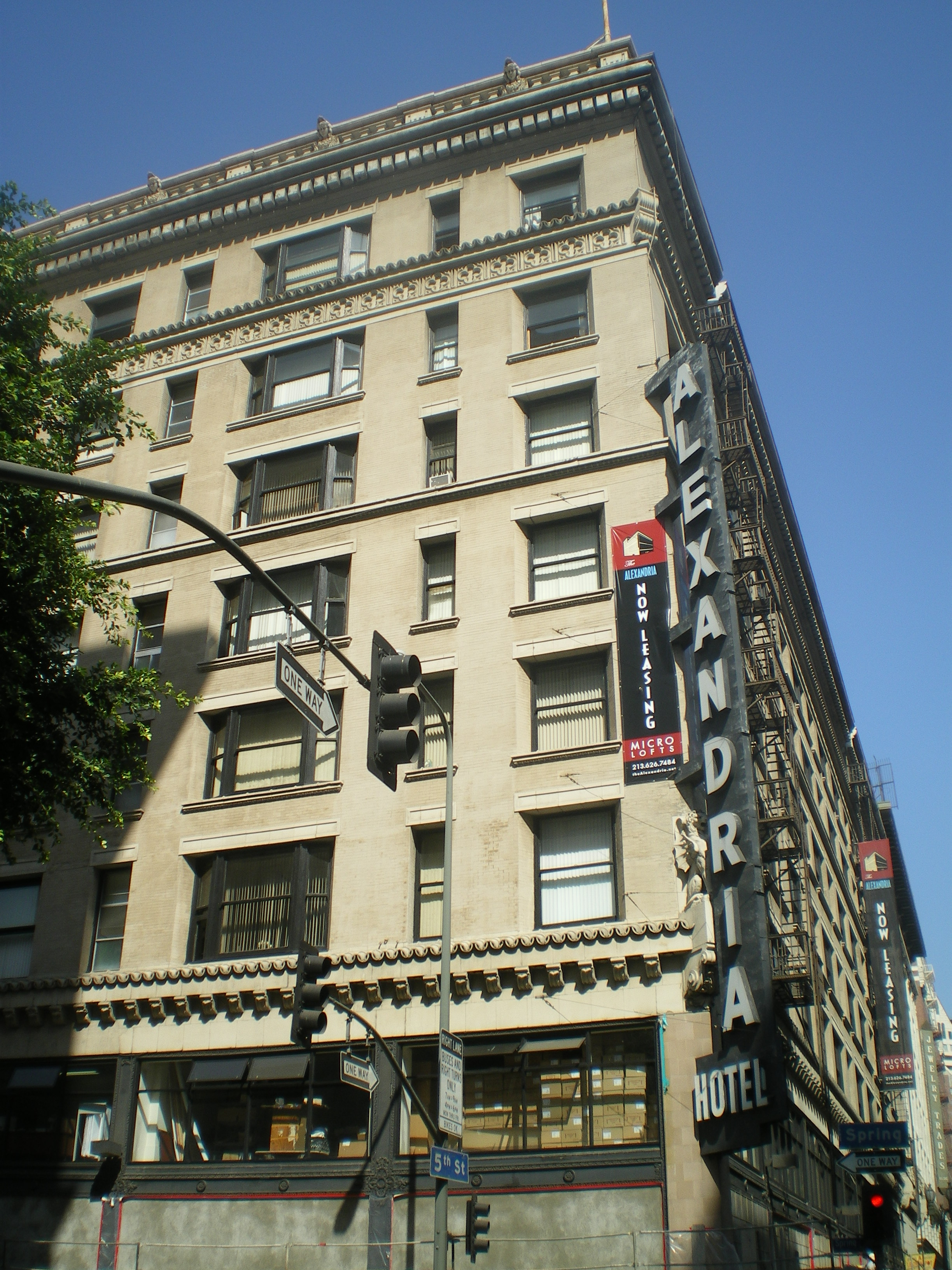
The building in 2008

Hotel Alexandria is built of concrete and pressed brick with a terra cotta facade. The original building is eight stories in height, while the 1911 addition is twelve stories. It features a Beaux Arts design that is distinguished by large griffin sculptures.

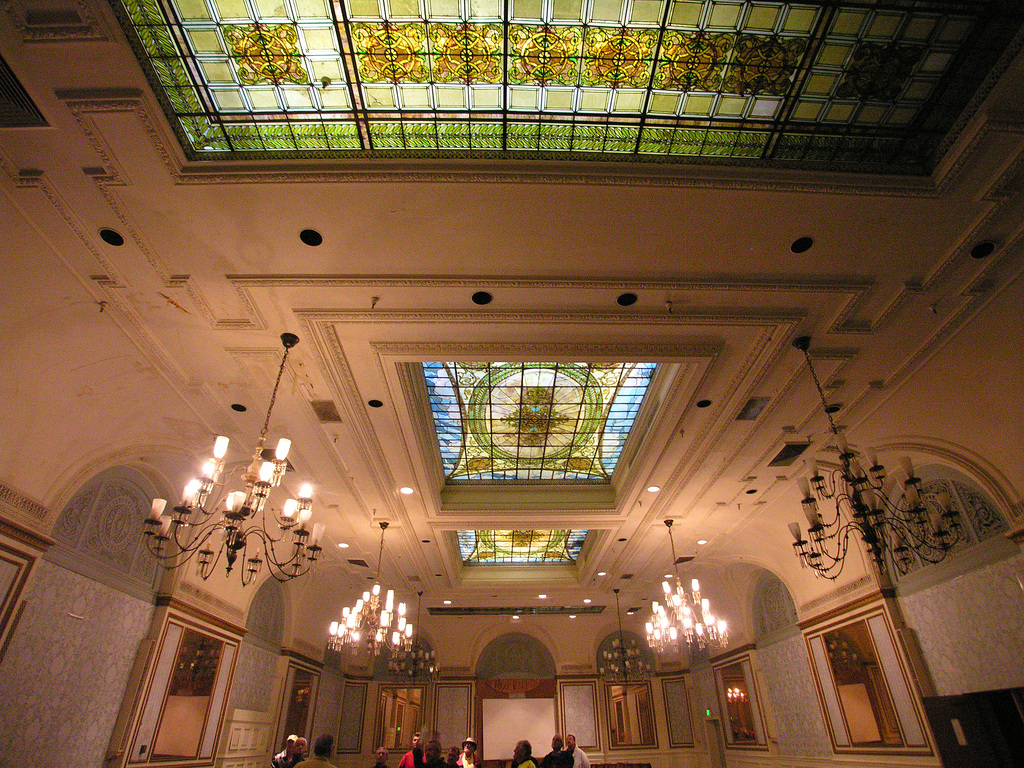
The Palm Court

Inside, the hotel originally featured a marble entrance lobby with a mosaic tile floor and massive Egyptian marble columns that reached to a double-high gold leaf ceiling. The lobby was later cut in half when a mezzanine was added. The hotel's crowing jewel, however, is its 199-foot (61 m) Palm Court, located in the hotel's 1911 addition and featuring a stained glass ceiling that has been described as "spectacular."

== Film location ==
Hotel Alexandria has hosted numerous film shoots. The building's ornate decor, marble staircases, and decaying grandeur made it popular in movies, music videos, commercials, and fashion shoots. In Seven (1995), the hotel served as John Doe's residence and the location of a lengthy chase sequence. Other films that shot in the Alexandria include A Midnight Romance (1919), Dreamgirls (2006), Water for Elephants (2011), Spider-Man 3 (2007), and Domino (2005). The music video for "Little Sister" by Dwight Yoakam was also filmed in one of the hotel's ballrooms.

American Horror Story: Hotel incorporated stories of Hotel Alexandria hauntings in the show.

== See also ==
- List of contributing properties in the Spring Street Financial District
