= Leaf Hall =

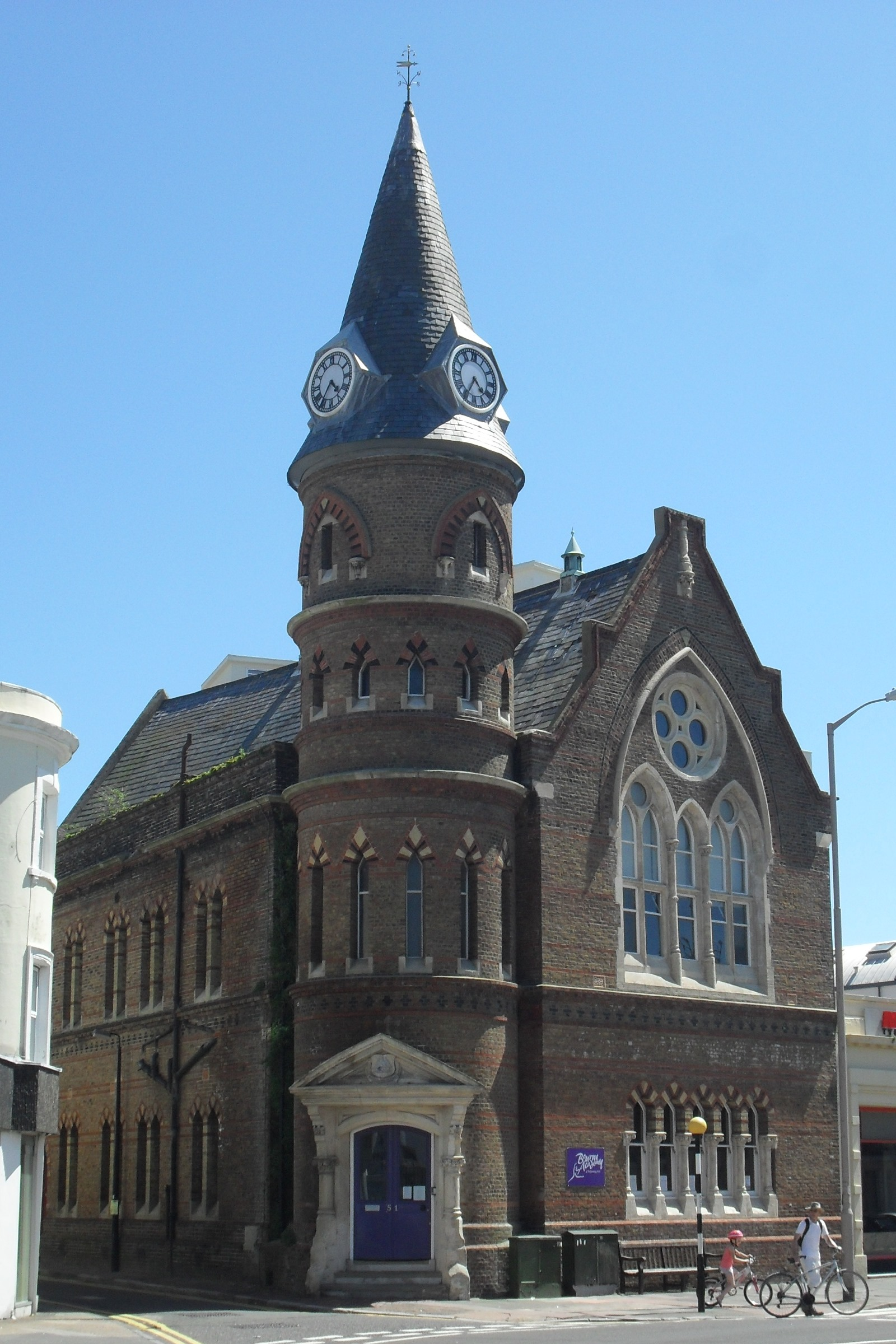
- Leaf Hall

- Location within East Sussex
- 50°46′16″N 0°17′43″E
- Location: 51 Seaside, Eastbourne
- OS grid reference: TV6193399348

History
- Built: 1864–1864

Site notes
- Area: East Sussex
- Architect: Robert Knott Blessley

Listed Building – Grade II
- Official name: Leaf Hall
- Designated: 27 July 2017
- Reference no.: 1447081

Leaf Hall is a grade II listed former working men's institute in Eastbourne, East Sussex. It was built in 1863–64 to a design by Robert Knott Blessley in a continental gothic style for the philanthropist William Leaf. It was closely associated with the temperance movement. The building now serves as a community arts centre.

The foundation stone stated the building's purpose was "to promote the social, moral and spiritual welfare of the working classes of Eastbourne". The hall's facilities included a coffee room, lending library and reading room, smoking room, skittle yard and a lecture room capable of seating 200 people. In the absence of a local theatre the hall was used for staging visiting shows, including General Tom Thumb in 1865.

== See also ==
- Listed buildings in Eastbourne
