= William Leaf =

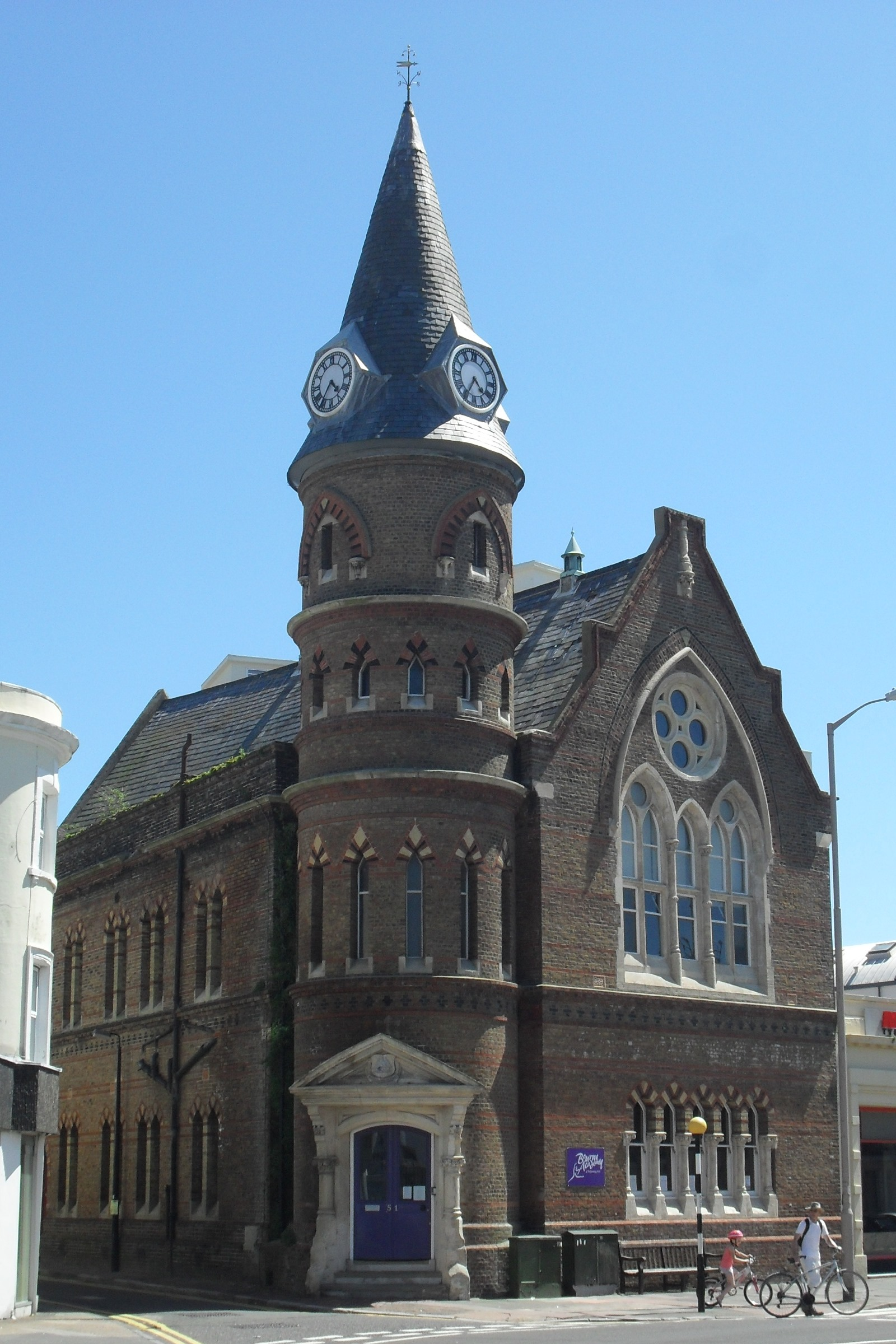
The Leaf Hall, Eastbourne.

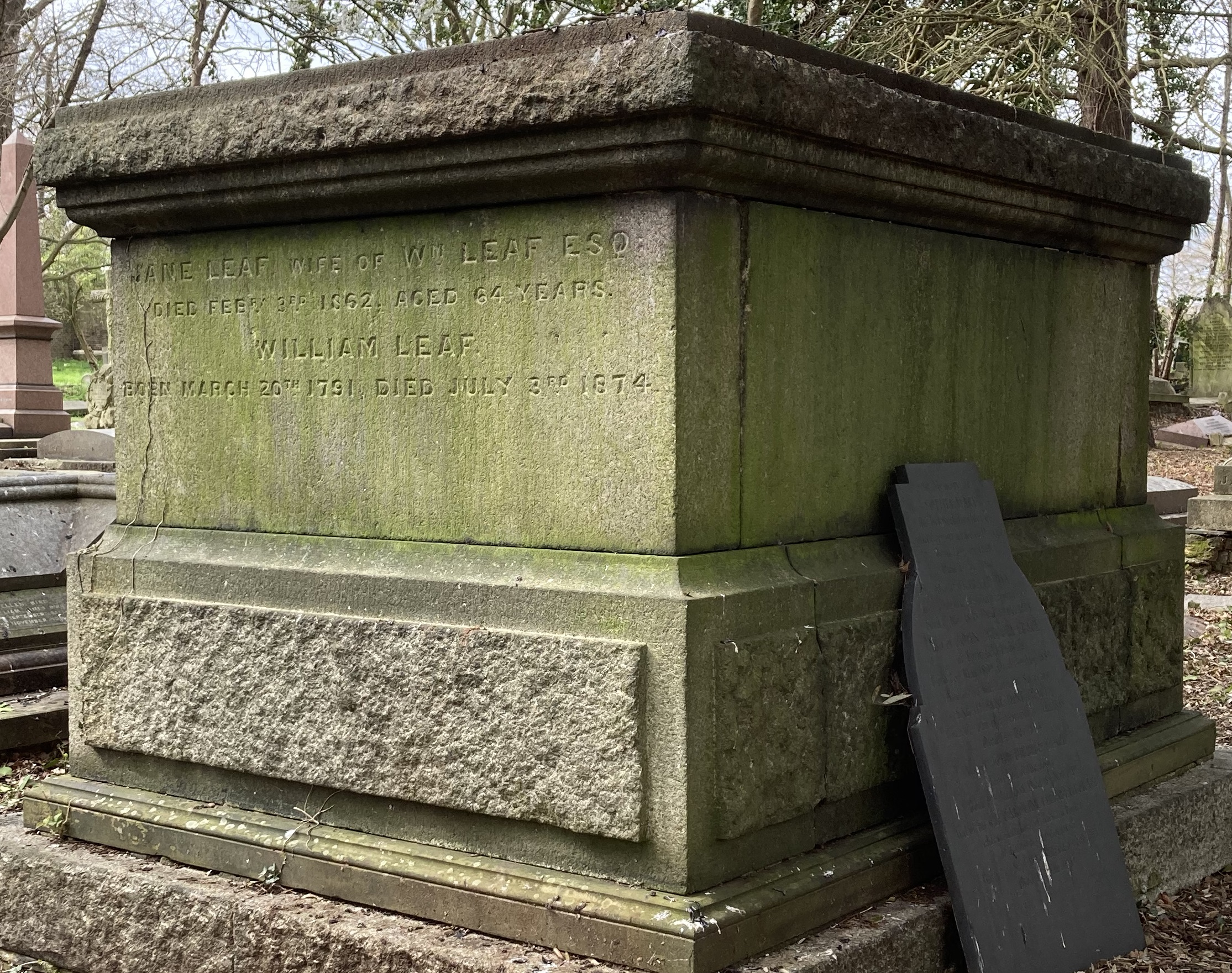
Family grave of William Leaf in West Norwood Cemetery

William Laidler Leaf (1791–1874) was a wealthy silk merchant and philanthropist.

== Biography ==
Leaf lived in Streatham, south London and had a holiday home on Eastbourne's Grand Parade.

Leaf was closely associated with the temperance movement and funded the construction of the Leaf Hall in Eastbourne.

Leaf is buried in West Norwood Cemetery.
