= Robert Knott Blessley =

British architect

Robert Knott Blessley (1833–1923) was a British architect based in Eastbourne, East Sussex.

He was born in Highgate, London to Robert and Mary Blessley.

After training as an architect, he set up an office in Furnival's Inn, London, before moving to Eastbourne in 1866. In 1878, he was in partnership with fellow architect Herbert Spurrell. During his time in Eastbourne, he was responsible for the design of several local developments, including the Grand Hotel and the Leaf Hall.

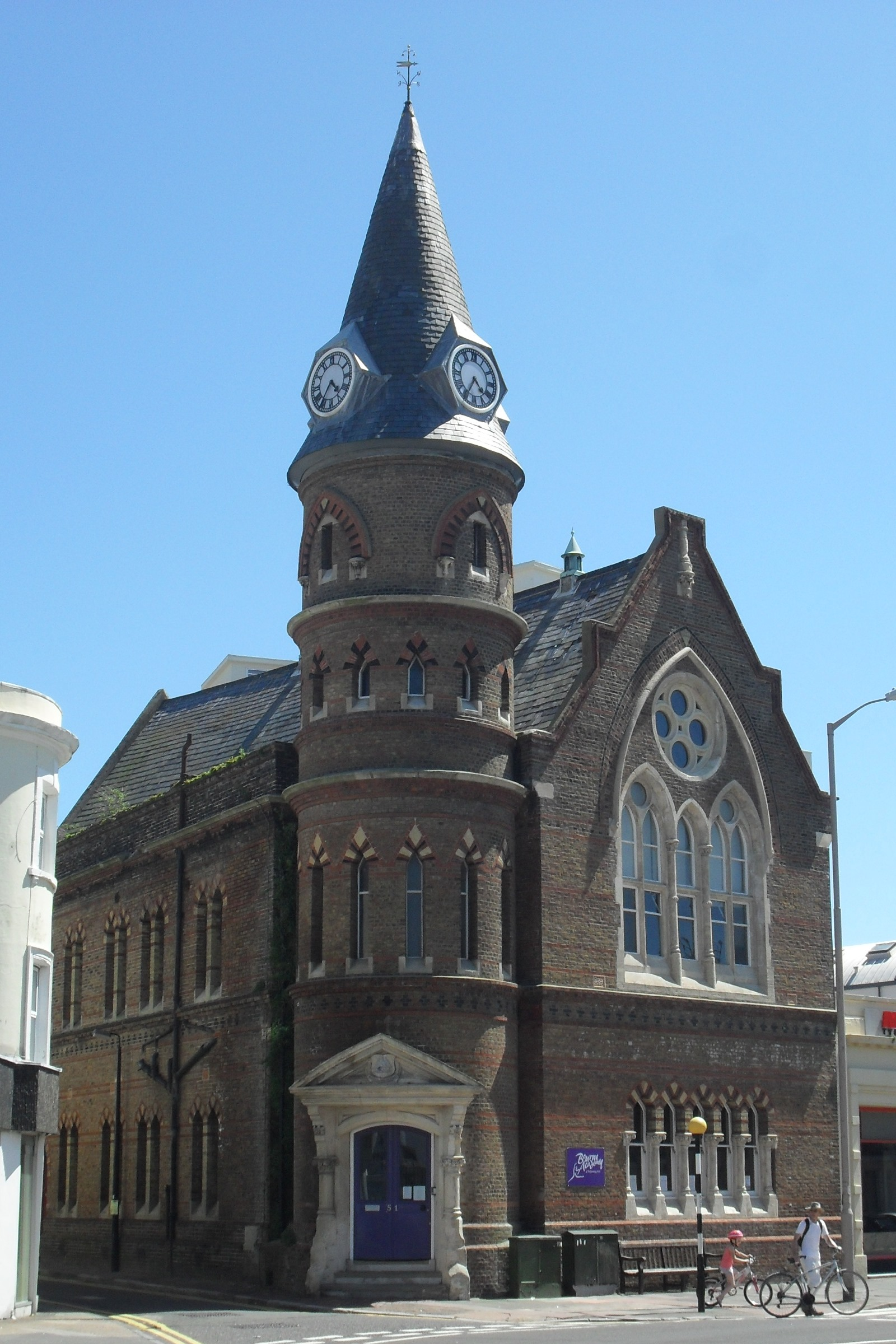
Leaf Hall, Eastbourne

== Major works ==
Leaf Hall in Eastbourne was designed and built in the continental Gothic style in 1863–64 as a working men's institute for the philanthropist William Leaf. Its facilities included a coffee room, lending library and reading room, smoking room, skittle yard, and a lecture room capable of seating 200 people. In the absence of a local theatre, the hall was used for staging visiting shows, including General Tom Thumb in 1865. It now serves as a community arts centre and is a grade II listed building.

Around the same time, Blessley was commissioned to build Eastbourne's first Wesleyan Methodist chapel. The first stone was laid in December 1863 and the chapel, Decorated Gothic Revival in style and situated on Pevensey Road, opened in July 1864. It was structurally unsound and was demolished in 1906 in favour of the new Central Wesleyan Church, which opened in 1908 a short distance away.

Grand Hotel, Eastbourne

The Grand Hotel at Eastbourne, built for resident William Earp in 1877, is a 5-star luxury hotel with a 400-foot frontage facing the sea. It has 169 rooms, including 23 suites, 30 junior suites, and 99 rooms, and offers conference and banqueting facilities with 17 fully equipped conference and meeting rooms of varying size. The hotel was taken over by the De Vere Hotel Group in 1965 and then by Elite Hotels in 1998.

== Other works ==
- Church and vicarage, Margate, Kent (1872–73)
- St John's Church, Polegate, East Sussex (1874–76)
- Extension to St Anne, Eastbourne (1883) (since demolished)

== Private life ==
He married Mary Ann Hollyer in 1875. They had a son Robert Walter Hollyer Blessley.
