= Palm court =

Interior design concept

The palm court of the Carlton Hotel, 1899, captioned in The Illustrated London News as "A Fashionable Resort of Today"

A palm court is a large atrium with palm trees, usually in a prestigious hotel, where functions are staged, notably thés dansants. Examples include London's Langham Hotel (1865), Alexandra Palace (1873), Carlton Hotel (1899), and Ritz Hotel (1906), the Balmoral Hotel in Edinburgh (1902), the Alexandria Hotel (court added in 1911) in Los Angeles, San Francisco's Palace Hotel, the Britannia Hotel in Trondheim and the Plaza Hotel in New York City. Capitalising on their popularity, some ocean liners also had palm courts, notably the RMS Titanic (1912).

== Palm court music ==
The term palm court orchestra is often used to describe a small orchestra playing light classical music. Light orchestras proliferated in the holiday resorts and spas of Europe from the late 1800s. By the start of the 20th century most luxury hotels, cruise ships, department store restaurants and cafes employed small orchestras or chamber groups to entertain their patrons. The Savoy Hotel in London, for instance, catered for the elite of English society and to visiting foreigners. "Sedate couples on the dance floor would enjoy waltzing to The Valeta and Destiny, with perhaps an occasional two-step in between". At the Savoy in the 1920s, Carroll Gibbons directed two orchestras: Carroll Gibbons and the Boy Friends provided light music for afternoon tea in the Thames Foyer, while the Savoy Orpheans played dance music in the evenings, with a nod towards jazz.

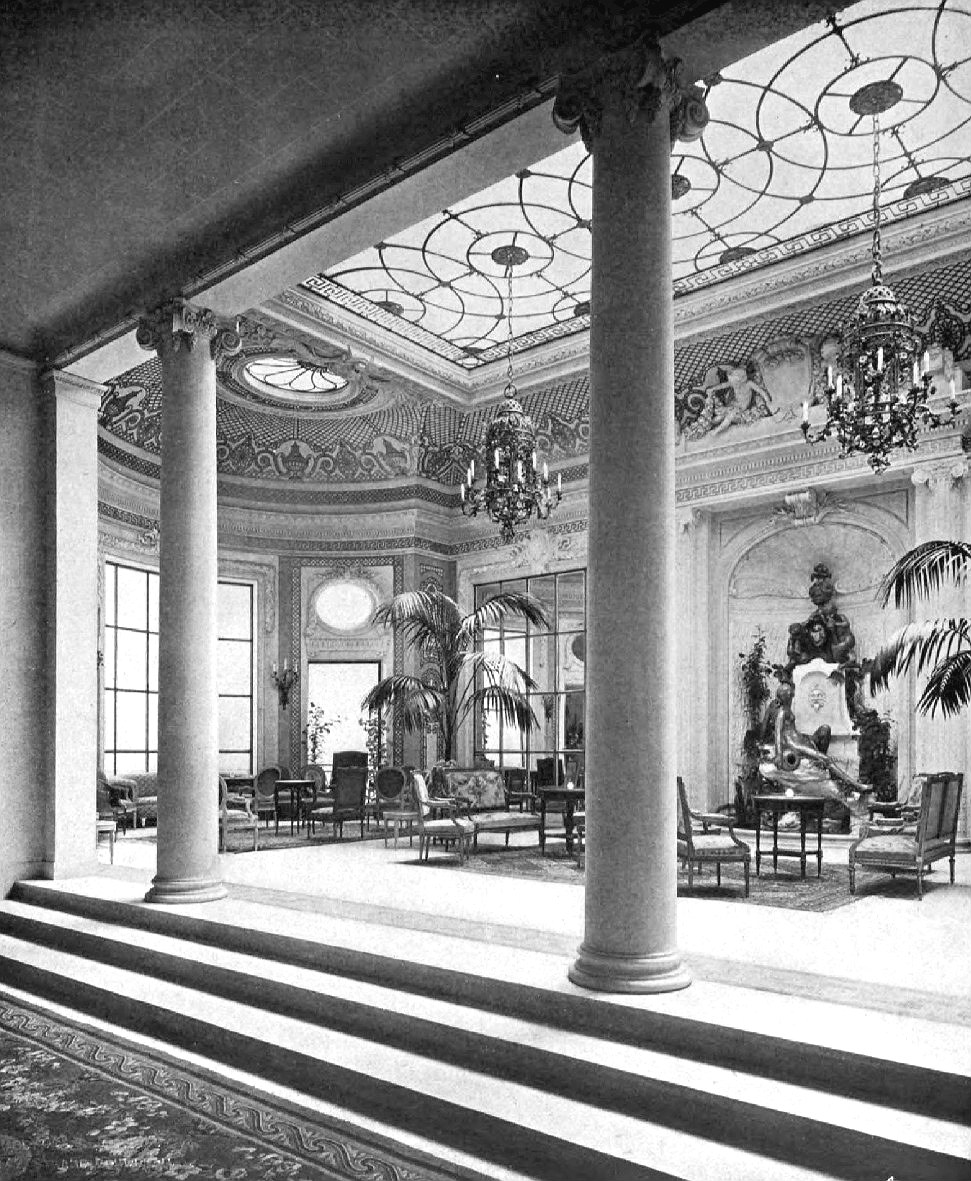
The Palm Court of the London Ritz in 1907

In the UK, broadcast relays of light music from The Grand Hotel Eastbourne by the BBC began in 1925 with an orchestra under the direction of the violinist Albert Sandler (1906-1948). (The hotel didn't have a palm court, the lounge hall was used for the relays). Alfredo Campoli founded his similar "Salon Orchestra" in the 1930s.

By 1942 Sandler was billed as directing "The Palm Court Orchestra", actually made up from a unit of the BBC London Studio Players, a pool of musicians put together in 1941 to form ensembles of different sizes on demand. The ensemble secured a regular broadcast slot on Sunday evenings on the programme Grand Hotel which ran from 1943 until 1973.

Tom Jenkins (from 1946) and Jean Pougnet were later conductors of the Palm Court Orchestra. Max Jaffa was leader from 1956, and also performed as a member of the Palm Court Trio with Jack Byfield (piano) and Reginald Kilbey (cello). Reginald Leopold followed on from Jaffa with a 17 year stint at the orchestra.

The fourth movement of Samuel Barber's ballet suite Souvenirs (1950) is titled 'Two-Step (Tea in the Palm Court)'. Originally for piano four hands, it was orchestrated in 1952. Barber wrote of the suite: "One might imagine a divertissement in a setting of the Palm Court of the Hotel Plaza in New York, the year about 1914, epoch of the first tangos." Lennox Berkeley's Palm Court Waltz, Op. 81 No 2 (1971) is an orchestral work written for an entertainment put on at the London Coliseum by Richard Buckle, and arranged for piano duet in 1971.

== Palm Court Palms ==
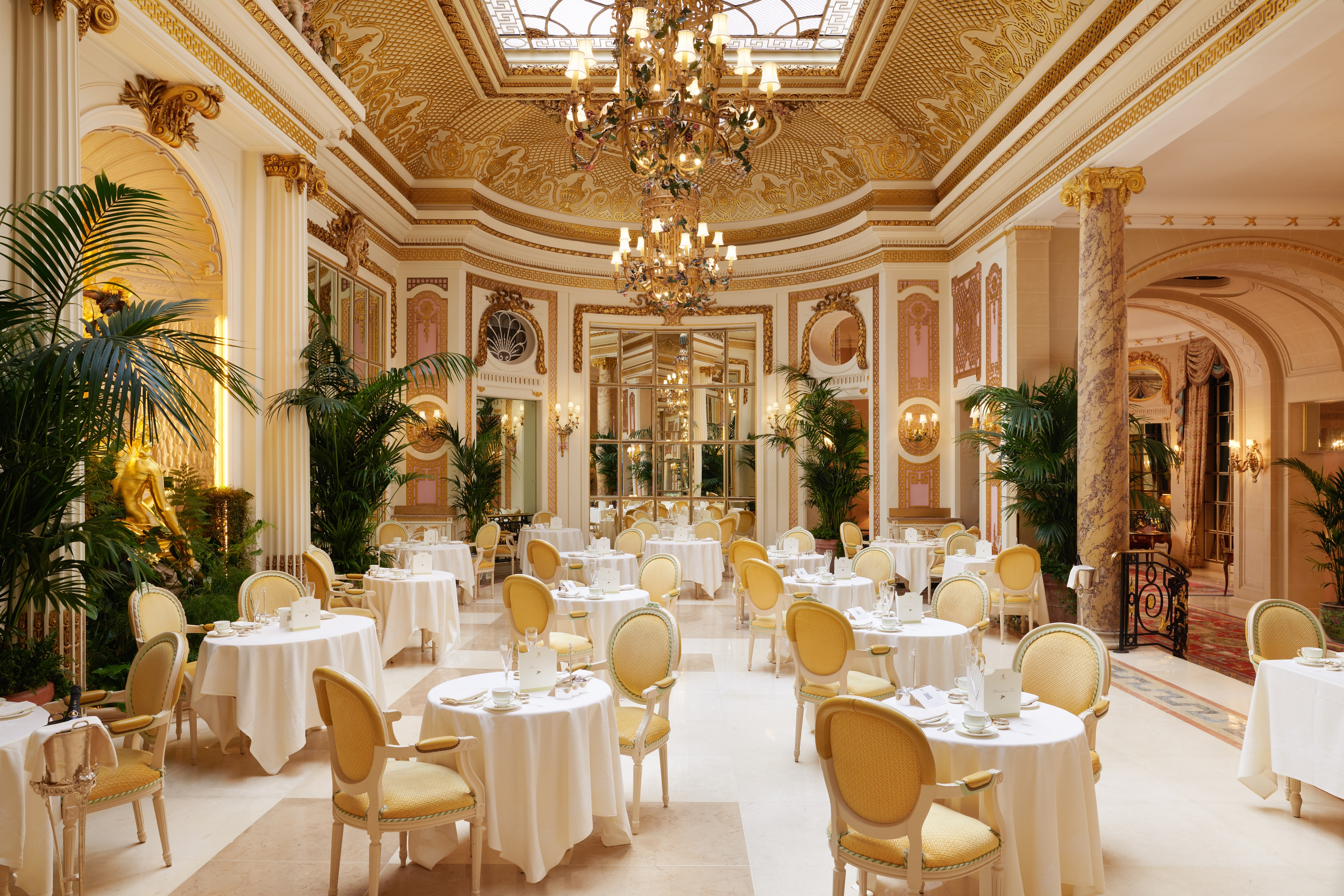
Howea forsteriana, the Palm Court at the Ritz, 2020

Howea forsteriana from the South Pacific was used in fashionable Palm Courts.

== See also ==
- Palm Court (Alexandria Hotel) - historic ballroom in Los Angeles, California
- Palm Court at the Ritz Hotel - site of "Tea at the Ritz" in London, England
- Light music
