= Palm Court (Alexandria Hotel) =

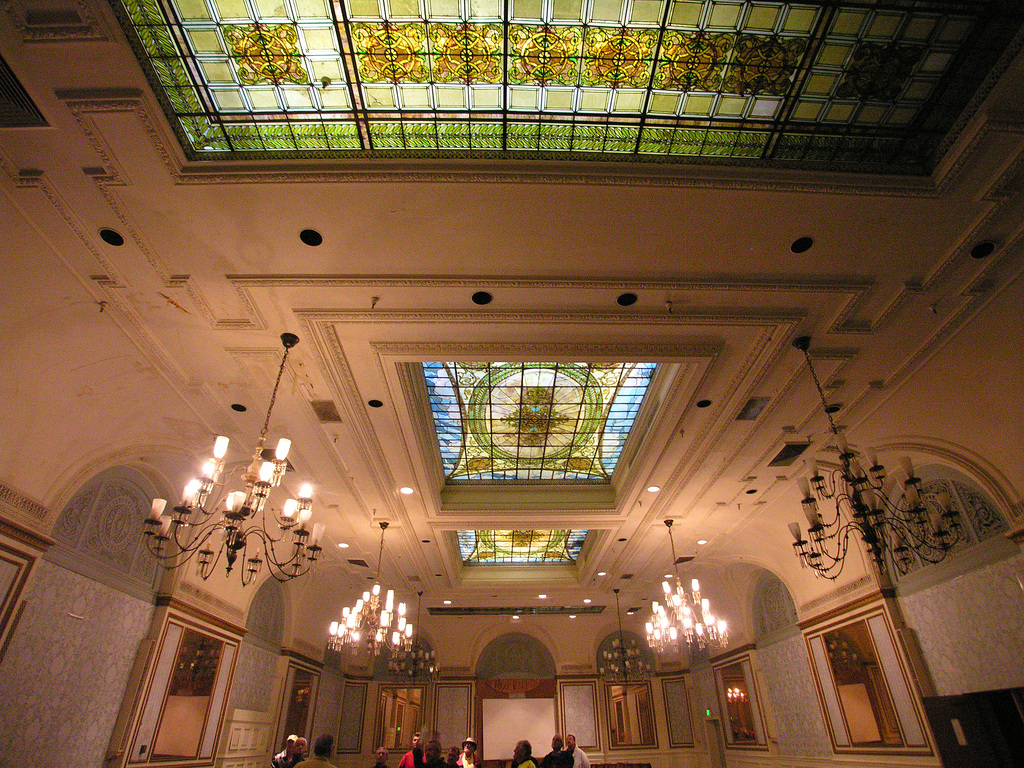
- Palm Court, 2008

- Location within the Los Angeles metropolitan area
- 34°02′51″N 118°15′01″W

Site notes
- Governing body: private

Los Angeles Historic-Cultural Monument
- Designated: 1971
- Reference no.: 80

The Palm Court, also known at other times as the Franco-Italian Dining Room, the Grand Ballroom and the Continental Room, is a ballroom at the Hotel Alexandria in downtown Los Angeles, California. In its heyday from 1911 to 1922, it was the scene of speeches by U.S. Presidents William Howard Taft and Woodrow Wilson and Gen. John J. Pershing. It is also the room where Paul Whiteman, later known as the "Jazz King", got his start as a bandleader in 1919, where Rudolph Valentino danced with movie starlets, and where Hollywood held its most significant balls during the early days of the motion picture business. Known for its history and its stained-glass Tiffany skylight, noted Los Angeles columnist Jack Smith called it "surely the most beautiful room in Los Angeles". The Palm Court was designated as a City of Los Angeles Historic-Cultural Monument (HCM#80) in 1971.

== Palm Court's heyday 1911-1922 ==
Built in 1906, the eight-story Hotel Alexandria was designed by noted Los Angeles architect John Parkinson. In 1911, the firm of Parkinson and Bergstrom was hired to design an addition that would double the capacity. The Palm Court was part of the 1911 addition. When the design of the new "crystal palmroom" was announced, the Los Angeles Times wrote:

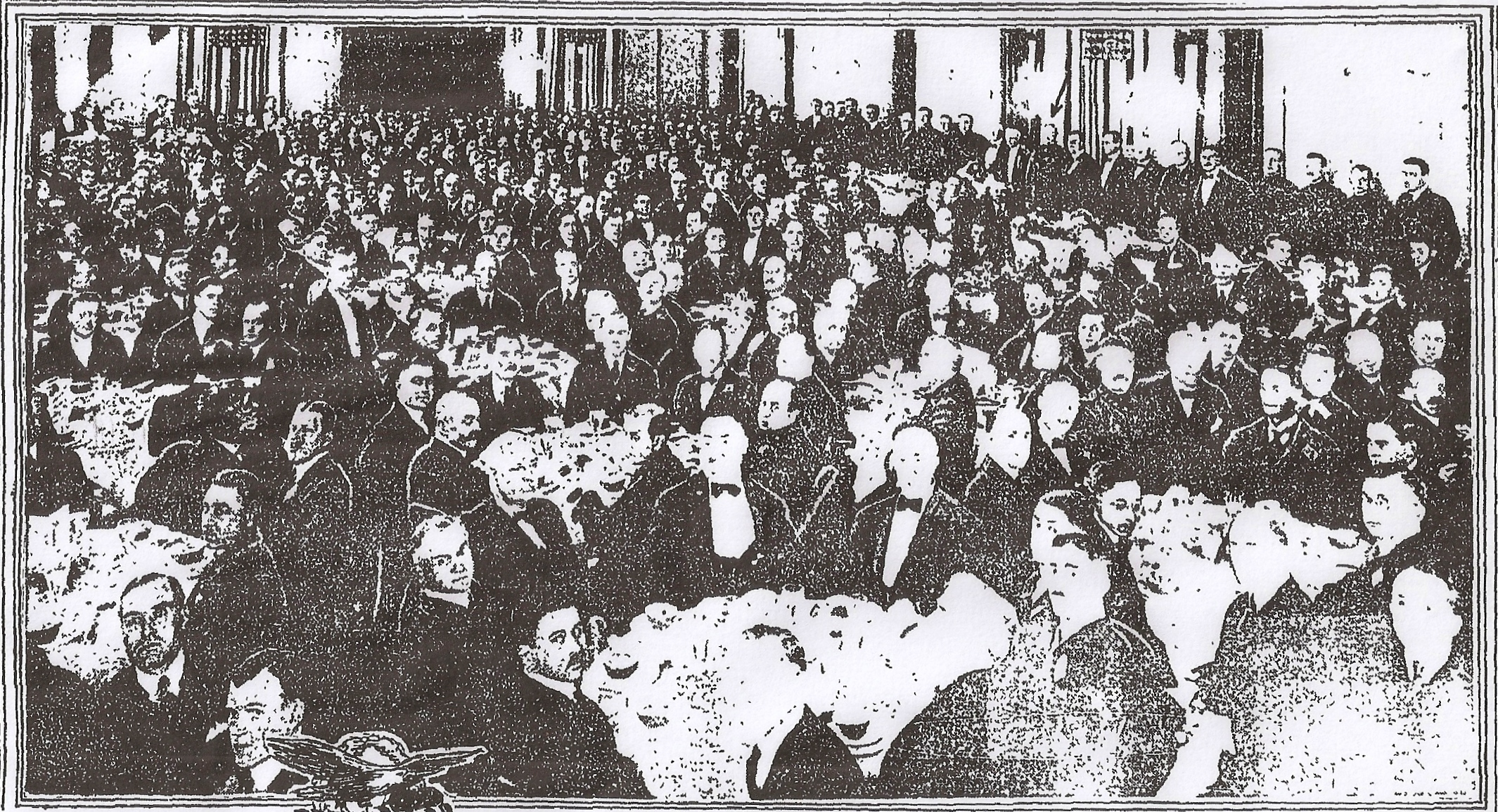
Palm Court as it appeared in 1920 during a banquet in honor of Gen. John J. Pershing.

"The room will be one of the largest of its kind in California and will be available for social affairs of every nature. Its primary object, however, will be more of a furnishing a convenient place for afternoon teas, card parties and evening receptions."

When the new ballroom opened in October 1911, it was acknowledged for its beauty. The room was "christened" in a gala attended by 385 of the city's "most prominent names." The Alexandria orchestra played throughout the evening," and the Los Angeles Times reported the next day on the city's spectacular new room:

"The great room, over one hundred feet in length and seventy-five feet in width, was a sunburst of light. Great crystal chandeliers blazed from a dozen vantage points, while softer and smaller lights were placed along the four sides of the room. ... The perfection and symphony of the great room held the guests spellbound upon their arrival. As the stately ladies and gentlemen entered the salon the pause each made at the threshold as with intense interest they swept the salon with their gaze was noticeable."

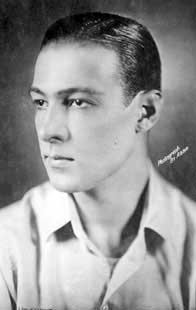
Rudolph Valentino danced with young starlets in the Palm Court.

For the next 12 years (until the opening of the Biltmore in 1923), the Palm Court was the city's most prestigious ballroom event location, hosting receptions for the likes of President Woodrow Wilson and Gen. John J. Pershing, as well as balls where Hollywood's silent film stars and early movie moguls mingled. By 1912, the Alexandria had become such an important gathering place that the Los Angeles Times wrote the following:

"What Union Square was to old New York, what Forty-second street is to the present metropolis, and what the vicinity of the Cort Theater is to San Francisco, the Alexandria mezzanine seems to be to theatrical Los Angeles. ... Hardly ever does the day pass in which some nationally-known actor or actress does not linger in the low settees or pause at the golden rail, looking down into the lobby below -- pausing, lingering, while in whispered tones behind rises the chatter that his or her presence has caused."

Rudolph Valentino, whose untimely death at age 31 caused mass hysteria among his female fans, was a regular visitor to the dances held at the Alexandria's great ballroom. Actress Claire Windsor recalled that, when she and Valentino were "$5-a-day extras", they rode the streetcar from Westlake Park to dance in the Palm Court. Silent movie actress Mary MacLaren later recalled that her mother had "blighted a blossoming romance" with Valentino when she would not allow her to go dancing with "Rudy" at the Alexandria. A third actress, Marjorie Bennett, also recalled meeting Valentino at a tea dance at the Alexandria, when Valentino was "a handsome aspiring Italian actor, Rodolpho d'Antonguolla."

In the Alexandria's heyday, movie stars and other celebrities, including Valentino, Mary Miles Minter, Sarah Bernhardt, Enrico Caruso and Jack Dempsey were guests. Charlie Chaplin reportedly kept a suite at the Alexandria and did improvisations in the lobby, and western star Tom Mix reportedly rode his horse through the lobby. The large oriental rug in the lobby was called the "million-dollar carpet", because there was purportedly a $1 million worth of business done there every day. It was there that D.W. Griffith, Mary Pickford and Douglas Fairbanks met in 1919 to form United Artists. U.S. Presidents Theodore Roosevelt, William Howard Taft and Woodrow Wilson, and many foreign dignitaries, also stayed at the hotel while visiting Los Angeles.

== Notable events from the Palm Court's heyday ==
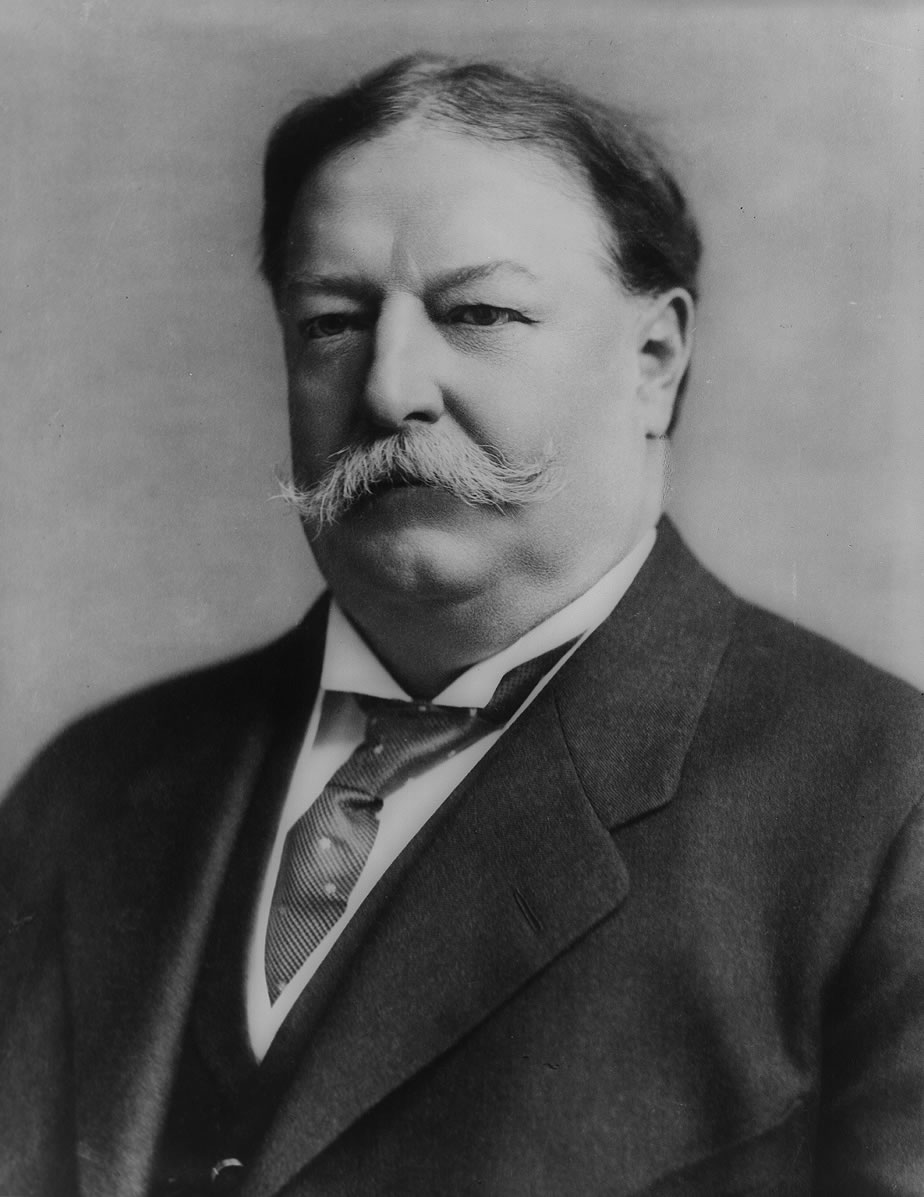
At one of the first events in the new ballroom, Pres. William Howard Taft delivered a speech advocating the creation of a court of nations to decide disputes between countries.

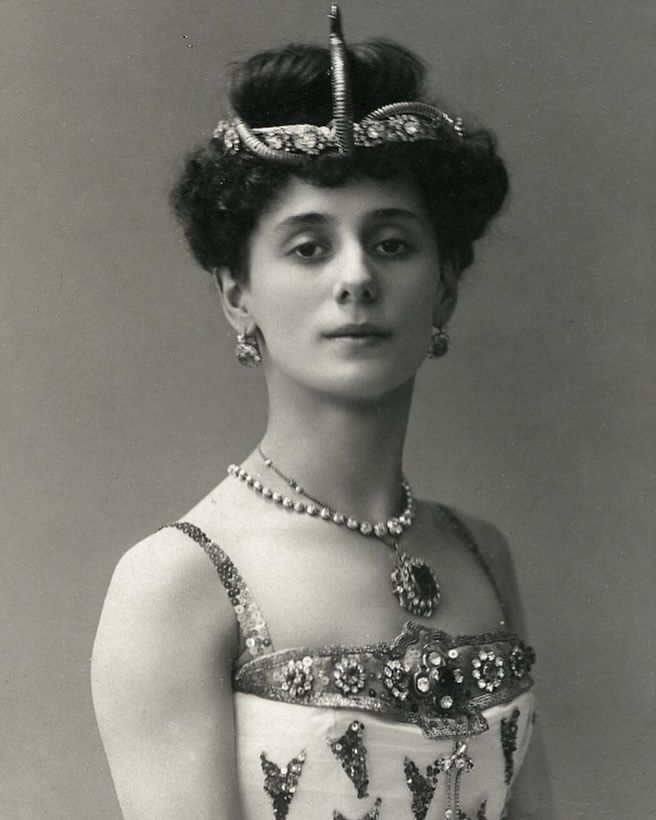
Dancer Anna Pavlova performed her celebrated "Glow Worm Dance" in 1915.

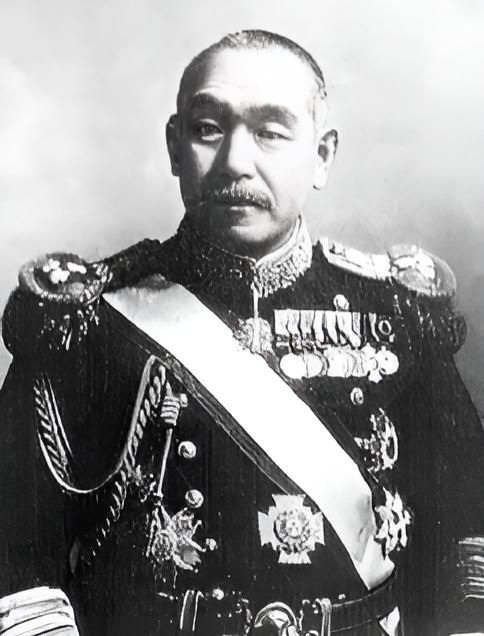
In a 1918 speech at the Alexandria, Japanese Vice Admiral Kantarō Suzuki pledged friendship with the U.S. and said, "No yellow peril ever had its origin in Japan." Suzuki was Japan's Prime Minister when it surrendered at the end of World War II.

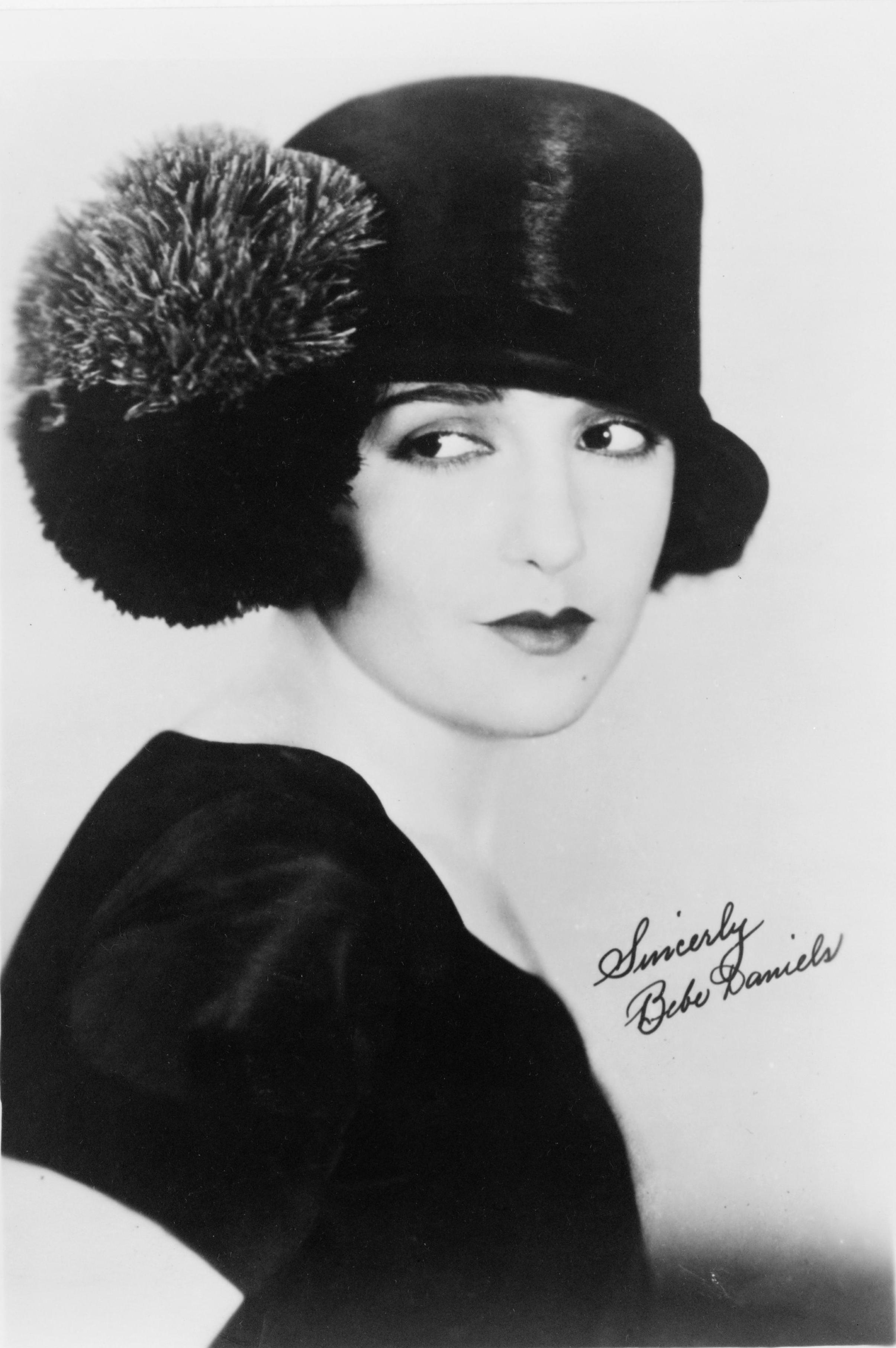
Bebe Daniels vamped at Hollywood's Thanksgiving ball "clothed in that siren shade of Viennese red."

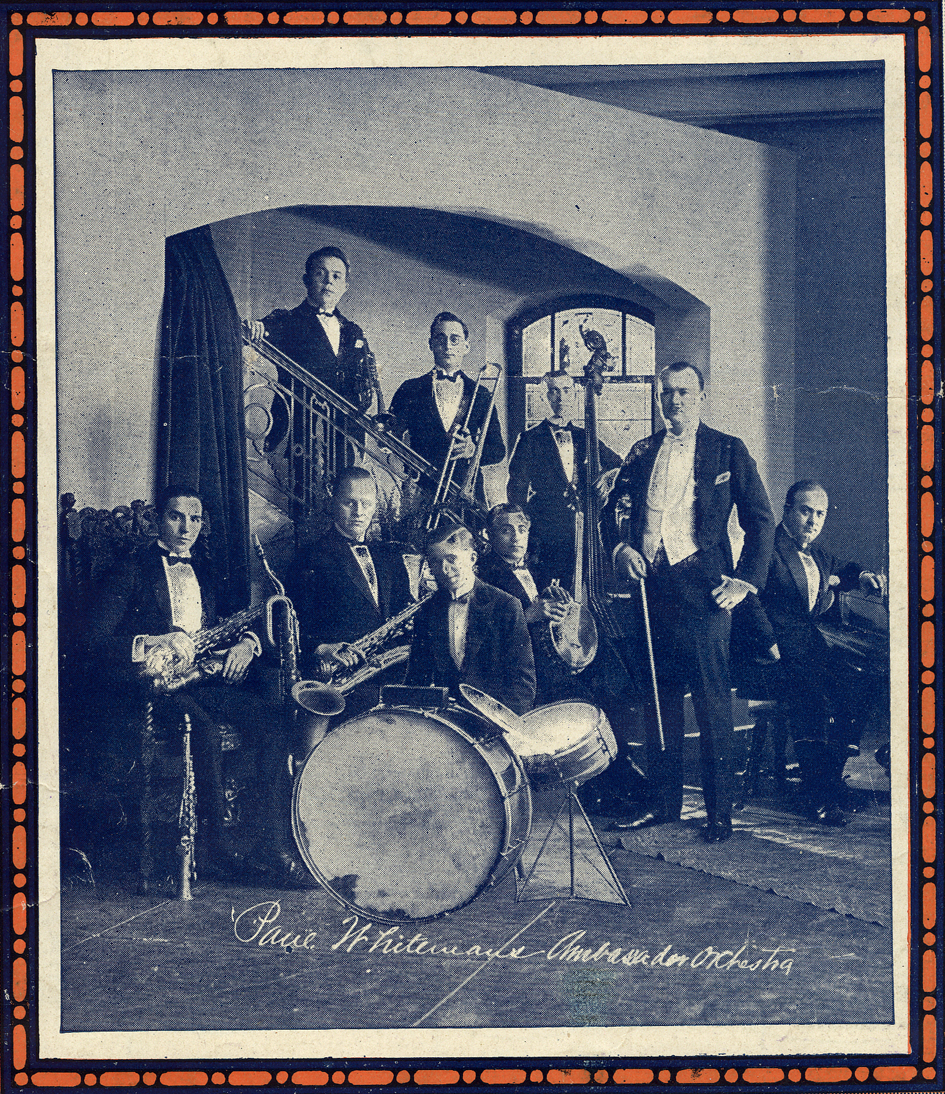
The "Jazz King", Paul Whiteman led his first band at the Alexandria, providing dinner and dance music for Hollywood's elite.

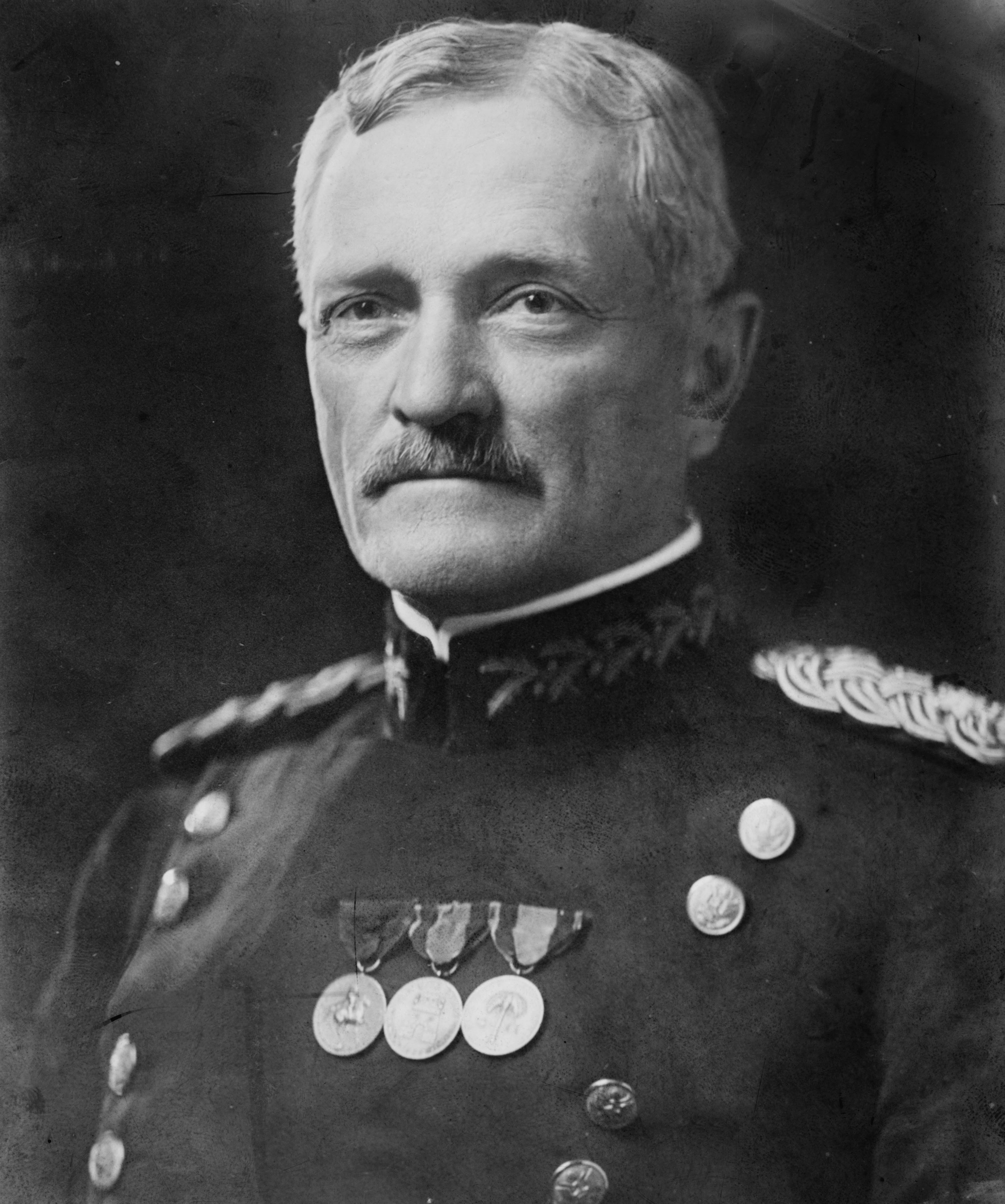
Gen. John J. Pershing condemned internationalists and anarchists at a dinner in his honor in 1920.

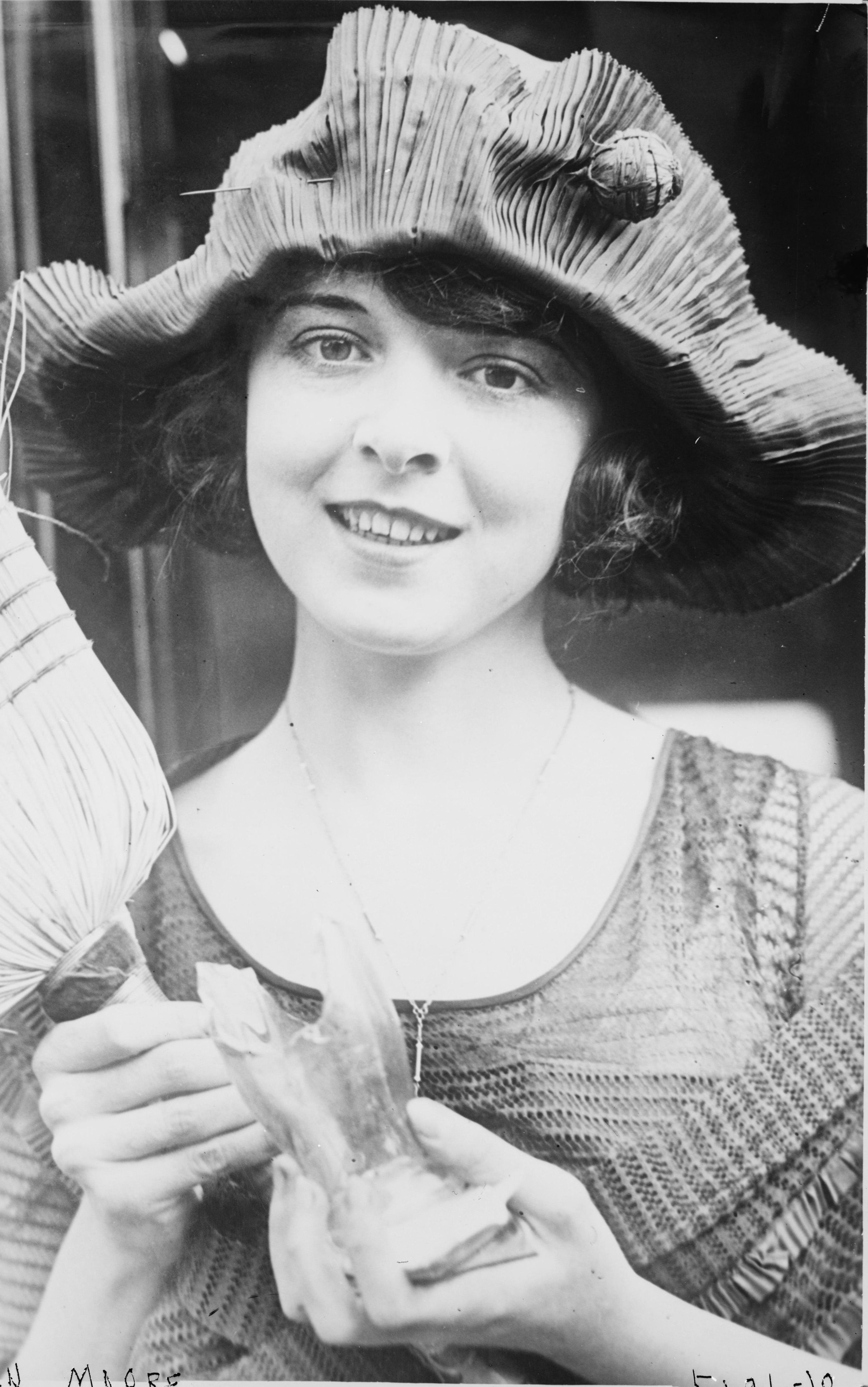
Actress Colleen Moore served as a fashion model at the 1920 "Christmas in Paris" ball.

From 1911 to 1923, the Alexandria ballroom (now known as the Palm Court) was the site of many of the city's most important gatherings. The following list identifies some of the notable events associated with the room.
1911

- October 1911 – U.S. President William Howard Taft delivered a speech on international peace at a banquet at the Alexandria Hotel. Taft noted that it is always "the wrong men" who are killed in war. He said that the rulers, legislators, diplomats and bureau chiefs sleep in safety while the soldiers who usually "have not the least idea of what the war is about shoot at each other on the battlefield." Taft advocated the creation of a court of nations to decide disputes between countries and suggested that "there should be no armies or navies except the army and navy of the allied powers which would enforce the decree of the court." The Los Angeles Times called the speech "masterful and statesmanlike in every sense of the word."

1912

- February 1912 – The city's leaders gathered at the Alexandria for an elaborate banquet in honor of the 75th birthday of Gen. Harrison Gray Otis, editor in chief and general manager of the Los Angeles Times.
- December 1912 - The city's first subscription ball since 1910 was held at the Alexandria, and the Los Angeles Times reported: "The social season of 1912-13 had its opening and it apotheosis last night in the ballroom of the Alexandria."

1913

- February 1913 - At a Mardi Gras costume ball, the Alexandria ballroom was decorated with "clownish faces of elfs of mischief" grinning down from every angle, and a girt with hundreds of small yellow bulbs, "each light covered with a grotesque masque", all presenting "a scene of ghostly enchantment" and casting "a halo of unreality." The Times described the following scene on the dance floor: "Serpentines glided in and out among the throng; someone started the Tango dance, a weird conception of rhythm and action which came all the way from Argentina and which offers something entirely new."

1915

- May 1915 – A.C. Bilicke, the Los Angeles millionaire who built the Alexandria and was president of the Alexandria Hotel Company, died while a passenger on the Cunard liner Lusitania, which was sunk by a German torpedo off the coast of Ireland.
- June 1915 - The Photoplayers Ball at the Alexandria ballroom was described by the Los Angeles Times as the "most brilliant entertainment which the photoplayers of Los Angeles have ever given." The dance was held in the ballroom and on the mezzanine with punch being served in the adjoining anterooms. Dinner was served at midnight in the grill. The event was enlivened by "brilliant little impromptu contributions in the way of witty speeches, songs and recitations" by actors, including Raymond Hitchcock, Tom Meighan and Carlyle Blackwell. Jesse Lasky made a speech on the future of motion pictures, and the other guests included Mary Pickford, Dorothy Gish, Francis X. Bushman, George Damerel, Billie West, Charles Clary, Herbert Rawlinson, Samuel Goldfish (later known as Samuel Goldwyn), Emma Carus, Myrtle Vail, Edmund Lowe, Mary Alden, Charles Winninger, Blanche Ring, Walter Catlett, Kathlyn Williams, Anita King, Fay Tincher, Bessie Barriscale, Augusta Anderson, Charlotte Walker, Marjorie Rambeau, Camille Astor, Anna Little, Cleo Madison, Blanche Ring, Florence Dagmar and Louis Bennison.
- September 1915 – In "one of the pleasantest social events of the motion-picture world", a dinner was given honoring dancer Anna Pavlova. Mack Sennett gave a speech at the dinner. Following the dinner, Mlle. Pavlova "graciously consented to do her celebrated 'Glow Worm Dance.'"
- December 1915 – A convention of the Produce Exchange was entertained by barefoot and Oriental dancers and whirling dervishes, and a complete cabaret show hosted by Irish comedian Harry Coleman. The Los Angeles Times reported, "Joy reigned supreme" at the banquet, as more than 250 guests gathered in the ballroom and "the fun was uninterrupted until the small hours of the morning."

1916

- February 1916 - Plans were announced to construct the Pacific Coast's first indoor ice skating rink in the Alexandria ballroom. Plans called for refrigeration coils to be placed at the bottom of an oval tank.
- March 1916 – At a spirited luncheon at the Alexandria attended by more than 100 prominent businessmen, the California Prosperity League launched its campaign against prohibition in California. The group advocated a vigorous campaign against the forces advocating the destruction of one of California's most valuable industries – the vineyards and wine manufacturers. Charles F. Lummis spoke and suggested that the Prosperity League also be known as the Sanity and Freedom League.
- December 1916 – The Cherry Blossom Players from Japan opened a month-long engagement at the Alexandria offering a production that included "Samurai, symbolic and humorous interpretive dances, folk songs with koto, samisen and shaquahachi music and several one-act plays mimed in the Japanese classic manner."

1918

- March 1918 - After the Alexandria's chef, C.B. Nagel, made unspecified comments at a Red Cross Society midnight frolic that were perceived by some to reflect disloyalty, a Department of Justice special agent lodged a complaint with the hotel's manager. Nagel, one of the most noted chefs on the Pacific Coast, was forced to resign. The hotel's manager said, "Mr. Nagel is a good man in his line, but it is impossible for the hotel to keep in its employ anyone whose loyalty is challenged. Mr. Nagel is a German and the war situation had become decidedly tense."
- April 1918 – The lower floors of the hotel, mezzanine, lobby and ballroom were turned over for celebration of Women's Liberty Loan Day. Several thousand "patriotic women of Los Angeles" participated in the rally. Actress Marie Dressler gave a speech in the ballroom boosting Liberty Bonds.
- April 1918 - Japanese Vice-Admiral Kantarō Suzuki was honored at a banquet. Suzuki pledged the friendship and goodwill of the Japanese people to the United States and noted, "No yellow peril ever had its origin in Japan." Suzuki was opposed to Japan's war with the United States, before and throughout World War II. He was the Japanese Prime Minister at the time of its surrender at the end of World War II.
- July 1918 - A Submarine Base gala to benefit sailors was held at the Alexandria featuring entertainment by Charlie Chaplin, Lillian Gish, Fannie Ward, Bert Guterman, Juanita Hansen, Fritzi Brunette, and Mary Miles Minter.
- August 1918 - The Stage Women's War Relief held an auction of kisses at the Alexandria ballroom to benefit soldiers and sailors and their families. The Los Angeles Times reported that "100 beautiful young picture actresses have consented to auction off their kisses at the benefit." Billie Mason and Wallace Reid were the auctioneers and referees at the event that also included dancing, music and vaudeville entertainment. The program included Belle Bennett, Wilbur Higby, and Jane Novak. Soldiers and sailors received their kisses free of charge.
- December 1918 - Initiating a nine-day fundraising drive, Douglas Fairbanks was the star speaker at pep rally for Liberty Bond salesmen at the Alexandria ballroom. Fairbanks rode an elephant to the rally as part of a "patriotic parade" through downtown Los Angeles.

1919

- September 1919 – U.S. President Woodrow Wilson spoke to a crowd of 515 diners at the Alexandria. Wilson entered the ballroom through an arch of grape vines, and "tiny electric bulbs gave the effect of glowworms in a garden." The dining room was a mass of flowers with the walls banked with great yellow chrysanthemums relieved by masses of trailing ferns. The president's table, at the eastern end of the room, had a fountain centerpiece surrounded by banks of California fruits, and 50 varieties of roses strewn the length of the table. When Wilson spoke in favor of the League of Nations, there was a hush as the president paused, and then applause came. The Los Angeles Times reported that the dinner presented a brilliant picture of the city's social and business leaders with the women dressed in beautiful gowns for the opening of the fall social season.
- November 1919 - The Alexandria hosted Hollywood's Thanksgiving ball, called "the great impeccable occasion of the year in Filmand." With Prohibition set to commence in January 1920, the punchbowls were one of the biggest attractions. The Los Angeles Times reported:
  "It got rumored around late in the evening that nearly a whole cup of claret, first and last, had been poured into one of the punch-bowls and there was quite a rush. ... Somebody also started the story that there was a mysterious room somewhere, and that all of a half pint of beer and nearly a whole bottle of perfume had been consumed, but the scandal was not verified, and I for one don't believe it, because if anything like that were on tap, Director Walter Edwards would have been on it, and he would have danced, whereas he never shook a hoof all evening."
  Bebe Daniels was "clothed in that siren shade of Viennese red and vamped whenever mommer Phyllis Daniels wasn't looking." Mary Miles Minter arrived at midnight in a tall blue limousine. Charlie Chaplin came and "peeped rather gloomily in, but he saw so many vulgar, curious newspaper people about that he hastily withdrew."
- December 1919 - Paul Whiteman, who would become known as the Jazz King, got his start as a bandleader, opening at the Alexandria and playing as the house band for the next six months. Whiteman performed dance and dinner music for "the elite of moviedom" before moving to the East Coast. Whiteman later recalled that he first seriously attracted attention of dancers while playing with his nine-man orchestra at the Alexandria. Bandleader Ray A. West, with whose band Bing Crosby was discovered, followed Whiteman as the bandleader at the Alexandria.

1920

- January 1920 – A crowd of 500 welcomed Gen John J. Pershing, leader of the American Expeditionary Force in World War I. Speeches were given "of 100 per cent Americanism" and condemning the menaces of internationalists, isolationists, anarchists, and profiteers. Pershing noted that ignorance had caused the fall of Russia and advocated requiring every foreigner to learn to read and write or be shipped back to "the foul nest from which they came." Pershing's trip also included a parade down Broadway that included African-American troops from the Rainbow Division.
- April 1920 - The Alexandria lobby was the scene of a post-dinner "knockdown and drag out fight" between Charlie Chaplin and Louis Mayer. Chaplin had recently separated from his wife, and when asked what caused the fight said, "Ask Mayer -- and ask my wife; they can tell you."
- May 1920 – At a Chamber of Commerce dinner, speakers predicted that Los Angeles would soon surpass Chicago as American's second largest city and become the gateway to the Orient and "the center of the world."
- December 1920 - The entrance to the Alexandria ballroom was decorated as a reproduction of the Dead Rat Cafe in Paris for a "Christmas in Paris" ball. The event included a fashion show with movie actresses, including Marjorie Daw, Colleen Moore, Clara Horton, Karla Schramm, and Sylvia Brooke, serving as models.

1921

- July 1921 – Film producer J.H. Goldberg invited Mayor Cryer, the City Council, journalists and 250 movie exhibitors to a preview of his new 30-reel feature, The Miracles of the Jungle. To secure the proper atmosphere for the film, dealing with "animals and the trials of a few white people in the heart of Africa," the ballroom was converted into a jungle scene with palms, tules, vines with cutouts of animals hidden in the foliage, and lithographs suspended from the ceiling depicting scenes from the story.
- August 1921 – While on an American tour, Italian Fascist General (and future Prime Minister) Pietro Badoglio was honored as a "World War Hero" at a banquet hosted by the Chamber of Commerce.

1922

- March 1922 - The Alexandria ballroom was converted into "Bugland" for the annual "Artists' Ball." The walls were covered with vivid purple, green, gold and black tapestries "depicting beetles, dragons, water dogs, and bugs, bugs, bugs of all climes, some of them so fantastic that they must have been imported from Mars." The wall lights were camouflaged with giant bugs, and the lack of visible lights "added mystery to the fairyland scene."

== Decline and use for boxing events ==
The hotel declined after the Biltmore opened in 1923 and replaced the Alexandria as the city's most prestigious hotel. The opening of the luxurious Biltmore put an immediate dent in the Alexandria's business. In October 1923, the Los Angeles Times wrote:

"The exodus of the Associated Cofraternity of Lobby Loungers of Los Angeles was completed yesterday from the Hotel Alexandria to the new Hotel Biltmore. Its members, like members of similar organizations in all large cities, must have the very newest in hotels ..."

By 1932, the Alexandria Hotel Realty Company was bankrupt, leaving $1,159,000 in outstanding bonds. In February 1934, the Alexandria closed its doors, and many of its finest furnishings and fixtures were stripped and sold, including the famed million-dollar rug, marble columns, chandeliers, and gold leaf covering of the mezzanine lobby. The hotel reopened in 1937 but declined again in the 1950s and became a transient hotel. During the 1950s and 1960s, the Grand Ballroom (as the Palm Court was then known) was used as a training ring for boxers. In 1958, Pajarito Moreno drew crowds of 800 people to his training camp at the Palm Room prior to his featherweight title match with Kid Bassey. Sports columnist Braven Dyer noted, that on learning that Moreno was training in a ballroom, his barber sarcastically commented,

"A ballroom, yet! What's this frijole expect? That he's gonna have hisself a ball with this here Hogan Bassey? Or maybe he's training for a waltz? Why didn't he go get Fred Astaire for a sparrin' pardner?"

In 1960, a Los Angeles Times article described the scene at the Palm Room where a dollar bought admission to watch world bantamweight boxing champion Jose Becerra and welterweight Battling Torres training for fights to be held at the Coliseum:

"You enter the Alexandria Hotel and find the lobby liberally sprinkled with knots of people, most of them Latin. They lounge lazily and converse in low tones. But when the door marked 'Palm Room' is thrown open, the scene suddenly becomes animated. Everybody surges toward that door, including women with babies in their arms or toddlers at their sides. ... The admission charge is $1, and bills rain down on the man at the little desk, though some don't appear to be that affluent."

Noting that Woodrow Wilson had once given a speech in the same room, the writer observed: "The (boxing) session ends to long applause -- probably more than President Wilson received. After all, he packed no punch."

== Restoration and historic recognition ==
Following a restoration in the 1980s, noted Los Angeles Times columnist Jack Smith noted, "It is a room of excellent proportions, and softly lighted by its lovely oval skylight, it is surely the most beautiful room in Los Angeles." In 2005, the Los Angeles Times called the Palm Court an architectural gem:

"Then there are the Alexandria's architectural gems -- the magnificent Palm Court ballroom with its stained-glass Tiffany skylight, for example -- that made it the most luxurious hotel of its era. It was the film industry's first home in the early 1900s, a place where dozens of studios maintained offices, where Charlie Chaplin and friends formed United Artists, where the lobby bustled with so many deal makers that a Persian rug there was deemed the 'million-dollar carpet.'"

The Palm Court was designated a Historic Cultural Monument (HCM #80) in 1971. As of 2008, the Alexandria had been converted to apartments.

== Blankenship Ballet at Alexandria in Palm Court ==
In 2009, the Blankenship Ballet Company established its artistic residence at the Alexandria Hotel with the goal of revitalizing the Palm Court. In May 2010 the Blankenship Ballet Company created and produced the ballet-in-the-round "Cuban Ballet & Dance Extravaganza" featuring many ballet dancers formerly from the Ballet Nacional de Cuba. The Blankenship Ballet Company's May 2010 "Cuban Ballet & Dance Extravaganza" in Palm Court was documented by Supreme Master Television and played in multiple languages and dialects all over the world.

== See also ==
- List of Los Angeles Historic-Cultural Monuments in Downtown Los Angeles
- Palm court
